= Di Vittorio station =

Metro station in Naples, Italy

Coordinates: 40.8806°N 14.2743°E

Di Vittorio

General information
- System: Naples Metro station
- Operator: ANM
- Lines: Line 1, Line 10 and Line 11
- Connections: Urban and suburban buses

Other information
- Status: Under construction
Route map
- (**) Under construction
- (*) Planned (**) Under construction
Location

Di Vittorio will be a station on lines 1, 10 and 11 of the Naples Metro. It is located in the Secondigliano quarter, between Piazza Giuseppe Di Vittorio (also known as Piazza Capodichino) and Viale Comandante Umberto Maddalena (also known as Doganella).

== Station layout ==
It is the last of the four stations designed by Antonio Nanu and whose construction was entrusted to EAV, to allow the closure of the loop of Line 1 and the continuation of Line 11 towards the center of Naples, retracing the route of the old lower Alifana; the other three are Miano, Regina Margherita and Secondigliano.

== History ==
Although the station was part of the project started in 2001, the construction of the section saw the gradual opening of the construction sites from west to east, which is why the first construction site to be opened was the one between Piscinola Scampia and Miano, while the construction site Di Vittorio would have been the last in chronological order to be inaugurated. For this reason, also thanks to the blockage of the construction sites which took place on 2 July 2010 at the hands of the Caldoro council and the subsequent release only 7 years later, on 22 April 2017, which took place thanks to the intervention of the De Luca council and EAV, the works only started in 2019 with the demolition of a part of the boundary wall of the Capodichino military airport and the excavation of the station shaft. The completion of the works is expected by the end of 2024, in conjunction with the conclusion of the excavation of the tunnel connecting the Di Vittorio and Capodichino stations and the consequent closure of the ring.

The creation of a cycle-pedestrian path is planned which retraces the route of the former low Alifana from Via Comunale Vecchia di Miano to Doganella, passing on the Calata Capodichino at the point where the old railway bridge was present in the past, demolished due to the deterioration conditions in which it poured and which will be subsequently rebuilt.

== Connections ==
- Bus stop
