= Line 10 (Naples Metro) =

Rapid transit line in Naples, Italy

Overview
- Locale: Naples, Campania, Italy
- Termini: Di Vittorio; Afragola Centro
- Connecting lines: Lines 1 and 11
- Stations: 13
- Colour on map: Grey

Service
- Type: Rapid transit
- System: Naples Metro
- Operator(s): ANM and EAV
- Depot: Afragola Depot
- Rolling stock: CAF Inneo

Technical
- Line length: 12.35 km (7.67 mi)
- Character: Deep level
- Track gauge: 1,435 mm (4 ft 8 1/2 in) standard gauge
- Electrification: 1,500 V DC overhead catenary

Line 10 (Italian: Linea 10; Italian pronunciation: [ˈliːneːa ˈdjɛtʃi], locally [ˈliːnɛːa ˈdjetʃi]) is a Naples Metro line being built designed to connect the Naples Afragola station of the Rome-Naples high-speed railway with the historic Centre of Naples, with interchanges with Line 1, Line 2, Line 11 and the Circumvesuviana railway. The line itself is designed to be automatically guided (driverless) and connect the municipalities of Afragola, Casavatore, Casoria and Naples, as well as a branch called "Baffo di Arzano" to connect the municipality of Arzano with two stations.

== History ==
In 1985 the municipality of Casoria stipulated an agreement with the Naples Metro spa for the design of a metropolitan line capable of reaching Naples through the interchange with the planned Secondigliano station of Line 1.

The first feasibility study, in 1991, envisaged a route in 12 stations: Piscinola-Secondigliano, Parco del Sole, Monte Rosa, Arzano, Casavatore, Principe di Napoli (Casoria), Vittorio Emanuele, Casoria railway station, S. Antonio (Afragola), Afragola Town Hall, Afragola Salicelle, Porta Station.

Following the start of work for the Naples Afragola station on the high-speed line, the project was completely revised to locate the terminus in the station under construction.

The Municipality of Naples redesigned the route by inserting it into the "100 Stations Plan" adopted by the Municipality of Naples under the Jervolino council in 2003, with the name "Line 10". However, the consequences of the economic recession - which led during the regional council of Stefano Caldoro to the blocking of a good part of the infrastructure works in progress and planned - put the project in quiescence until 2016, when the regional council of Vincenzo De Luca relaunched the project financing the creation of a new feasibility study through ACAMIR (Agenzia Campana Mobilità, Infrastrutture e Reti), presented and adopted by the Campania region in July 2020.

The new project is spread over 13 kilometers with 13 stations: Cavour, Foria, Carlo III, Ottocalli, Leonardo Bianchi, Di Vittorio (falling within the municipality of Naples), Casavatore San Pietro, Casoria Casavatore, Casoria Centro, Casoria Afragola, Afragola Garibaldi, Afragola Centro and Afragola AV metro which will connect Naples to the Afragola AV station.

The investment is quantified at approximately 1.6 billion euros. Added to this is the project for a link road towards Arzano, approximately 3.15 km long, which departs from the route from the Di Vittorio station with two further stations (Casavatore Arzano and Arzano Centro), with an estimated cost of 459.5 million euros. In February 2022, CIPESS financed the project for 370 million, of which 333 for the section between Di Vittorio and Carlo III and 37 for the purchase of 7 automatically guided trains. The following month, the financing of another 2 lots was added (Di Vittorio-Casoria Afragola and Casoria Afragola-Afragola Centro), bringing the total investments to 795 million.

In December 2022, the memorandum of understanding was signed between the Municipality of Naples, the Campania Region and the Metropolitan City which gave the green light to the construction of the line, identifying the EAV as the implementing body. In March 2023, in an interview, the municipal transport councilor of Naples, Edoardo Cosenza, anticipated the decision to modify the route of the Cavour-Carlo III lot, eliminating the Cavour and Foria stations and providing the terminus in Piazza Principe Umberto, with interchange with Line 1 and Line 2 in Garibaldi. The preparatory works (geological investigations) began in March 2023.

== Route ==
- Principe Umberto (Interchange with Line 1, Line 2 and Circumvesuviana)
- Carlo III
- Ottocalli
- Leonardo Bianchi
- Di Vittorio (Interchange with Line 1 and Line 11)
- Casavatore-San Pietro
- Casoria-Casavatore
- Casoria Centro
- Casoria-Afragola
- Afragola Garibaldi
- Afragola Centro
- Afragola Alta Velocità

== See also ==
- Naples Metro
- List of Naples metro stations
- List of rapid transit systems
