= High-speed rail in Italy =

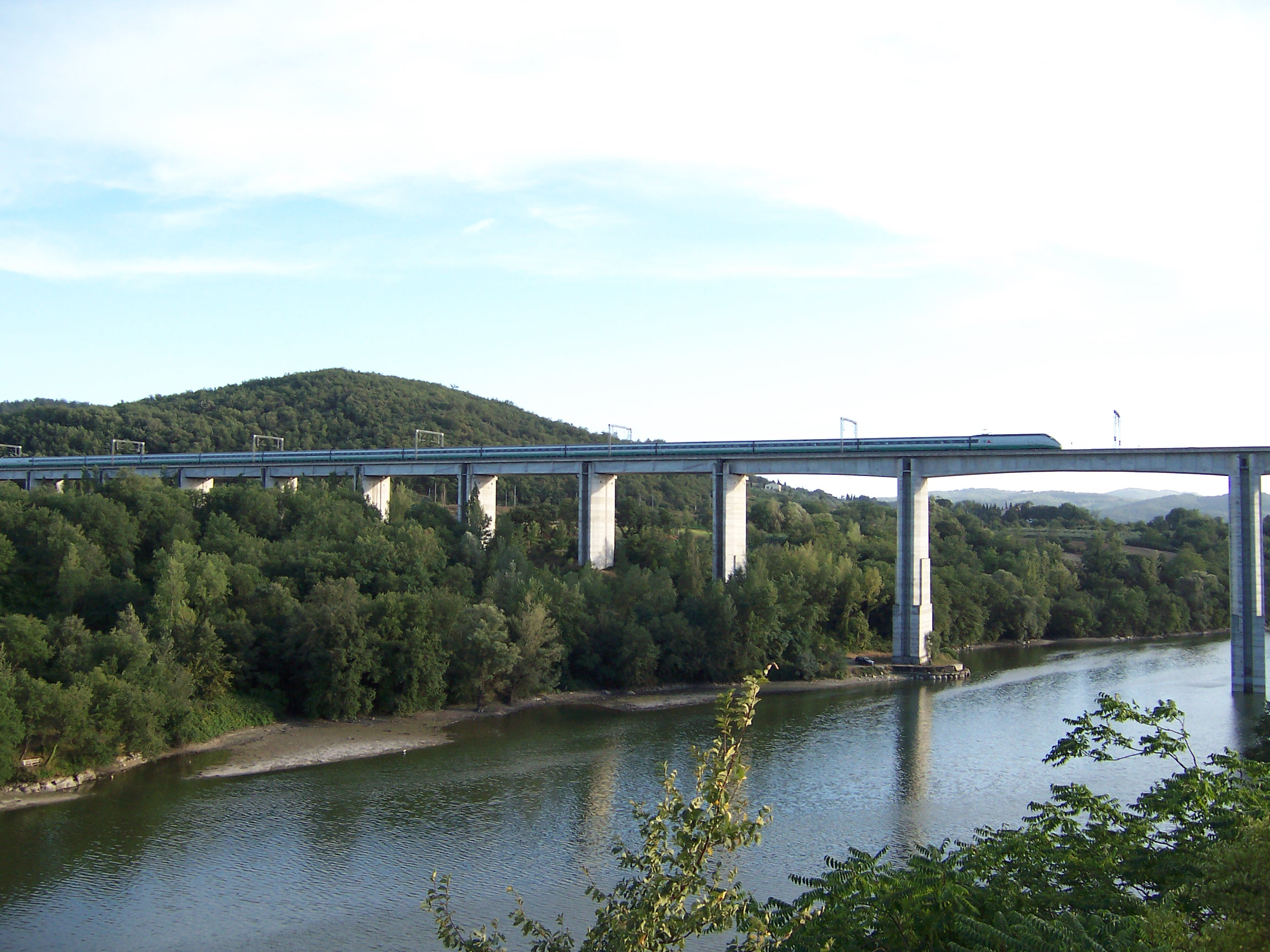
An ETR 500 train running on the Florence–Rome high-speed line near Arezzo, the first high-speed railway opened in Europe

High-speed rail in Italy consists of two lines connecting most of the country's major cities. The first line connects Turin to Salerno via Milan, Bologna, Florence, Rome and Naples, the second runs from Turin to Venice via Milan and Verona, and is under construction in parts. Trains are operated with a top speed of 300 km/h (190 mph).

Passenger service is provided by Trenitalia and, since April 2012, by Italo (NTV), the world's first private open-access operator of high-speed rail to compete with a state-owned monopoly. 25 million passengers traveled on the network in 2011. In 2015, ridership increased to 55 million for Trenitalia and 9.1 million for NTV, for a combined 64 million passengers.

== History ==
Passenger km (billions) by Operator View chart definition.
Passenger km transported on the Italian high speed rail network

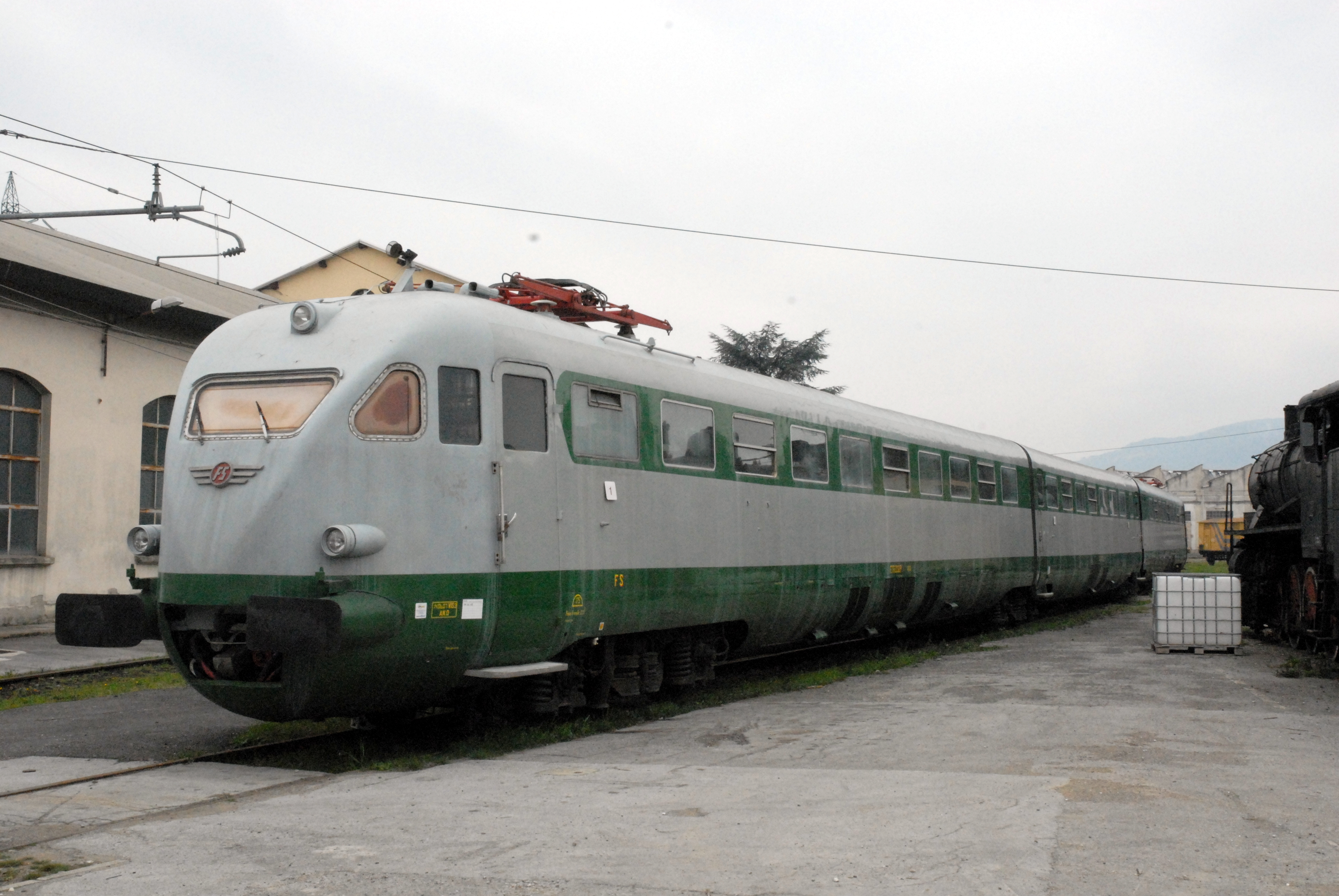
The original Italian ETR 200 trainset of the speed world record (203 km/h or 126 mph) in 1938, now preserved as historical train, was re-numbered ETR 232 in the 1960s

The Italian high-speed service began in 1938 with an electric-multiple-unit ETR 200, designed for 200 km/h (120 mph), between Bologna and Naples. It too reached 160 km/h (99 mph) in commercial service, and achieved a world mean speed record of 203 km/h (126 mph) between Florence and Milan in 1938.

The Direttissima opened in 1977 as the first high-speed rail route in Italy and Europe, connecting Rome with Florence. The top speed on the line was 250 km/h (160 mph), giving an end-to-end journey time of about 90 minutes with an average speed of 200 km/h (120 mph). This line used a 3 kV DC supply.

High-speed service was introduced on the Rome-Milan line in 1988–89 with the ETR 450 Pendolino train, with a top speed of 250 km/h (160 mph) and cutting travel times from about 5 hours to 4. The prototype train ETR X 500 was the first Italian train to reach 300 km/h (190 mph) on the Direttissima on 25 May 1989.

The Italian high-speed rail projects suffered from a number of cost overruns and delays. Corruption and unethical behaviour played a key role.

In November 2018, the first high-speed freight rail in the world commenced service in Italy. The ETR 500 Mercitalia Fast train carries freight between Caserta and Bologna in 3 hours and 30 minutes, at an average speed of 180 km/h (110 mph).

== Categories of trains ==
The main public operator of high-speed trains (alta velocità AV, formerly Eurostar Italia) is Trenitalia, part of FSI. Trains are divided into three categories (called "Le Frecce"): Frecciarossa ("Red arrow") trains operate at a maximum of 300 km/h (185 mph) on dedicated high-speed tracks; Frecciargento (Silver arrow) trains operate at a maximum of 250 km/h (155 mph) on both high-speed and mainline tracks; Frecciabianca (White arrow) trains operate at a maximum of 200 km/h (125 mph) on mainline tracks only.

== Rolling stock ==
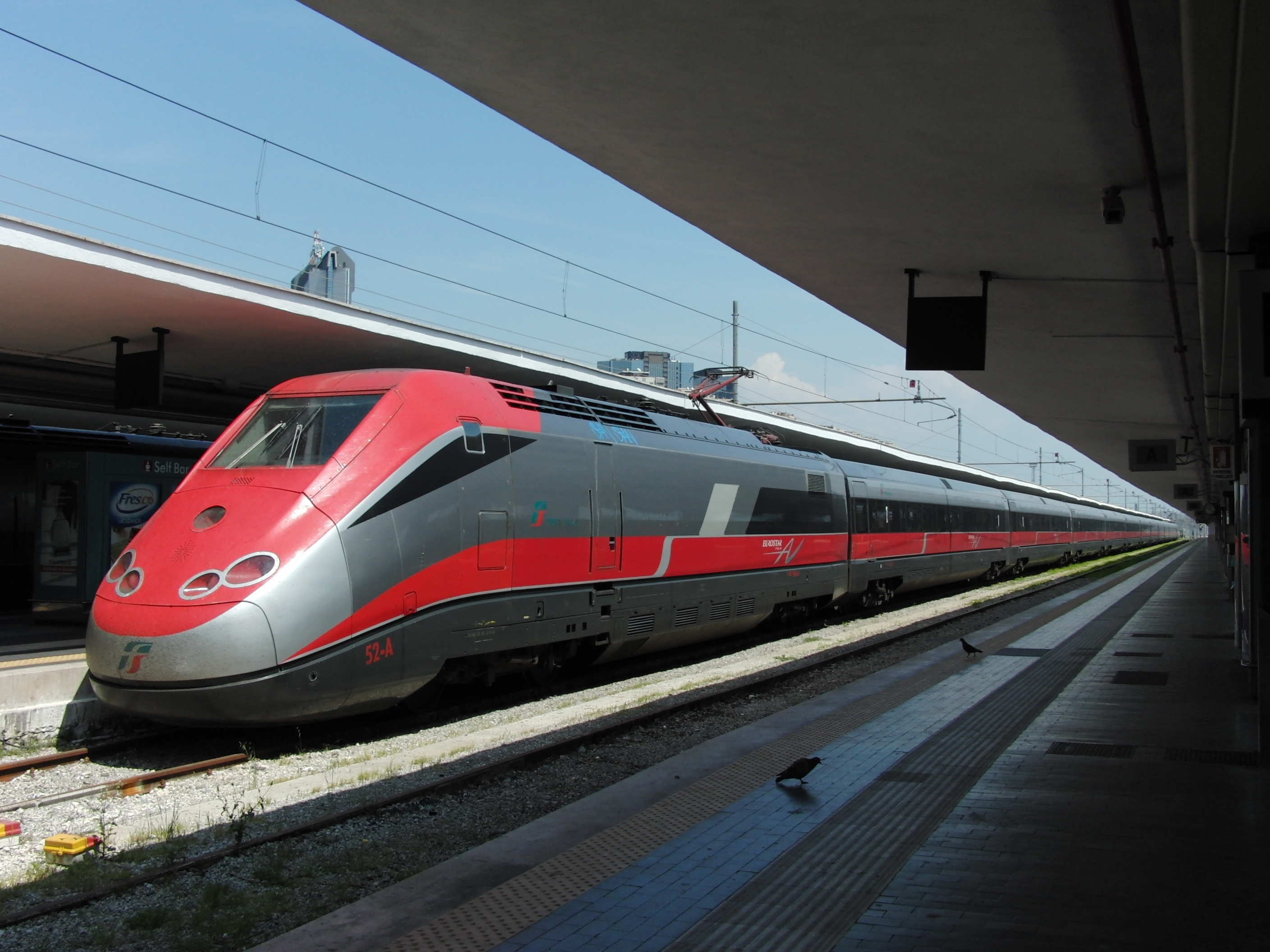
ETR 500 Frecciarossa (Trenitalia)

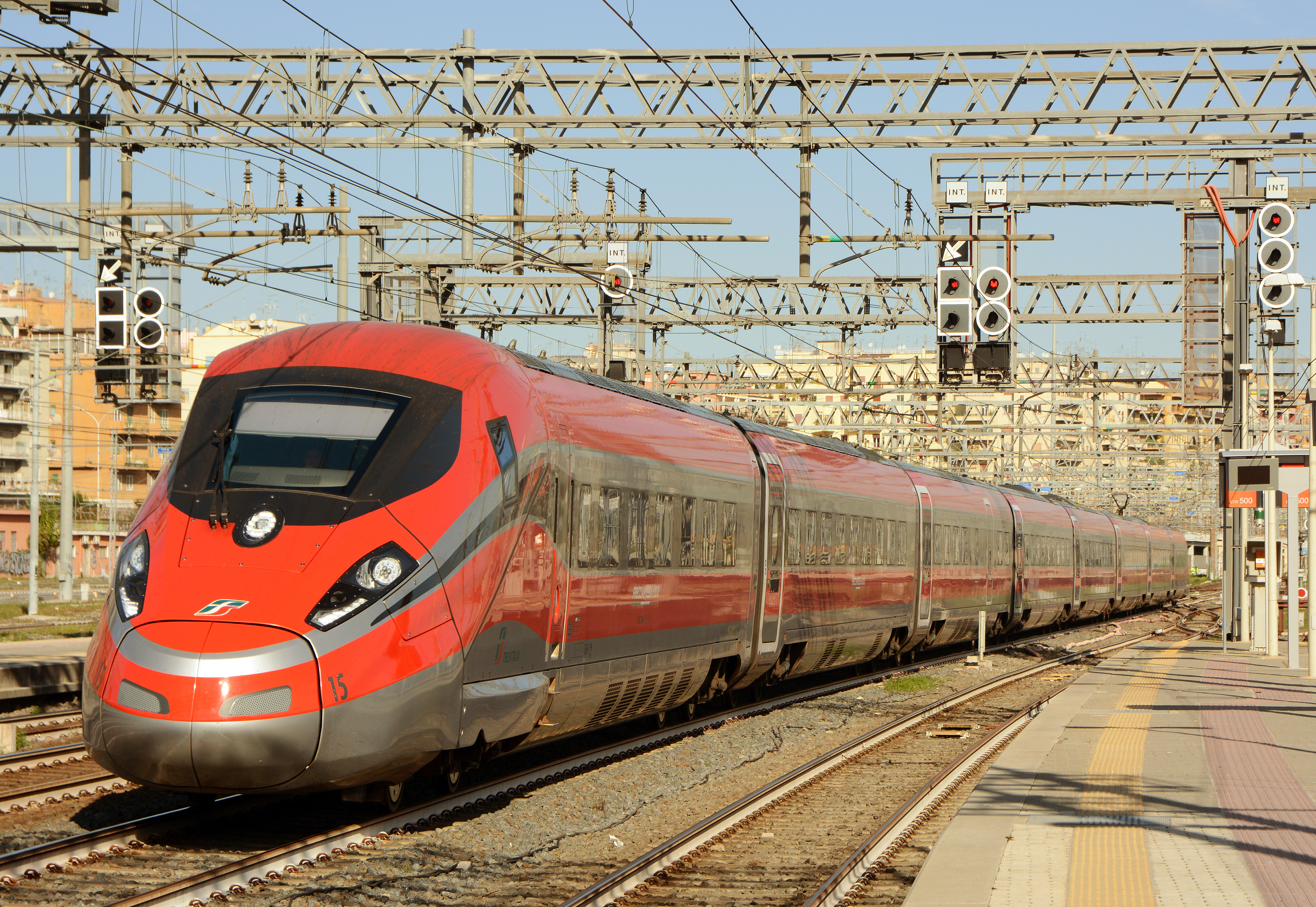
ETR 1000 Frecciarossa 1000 (Trenitalia)

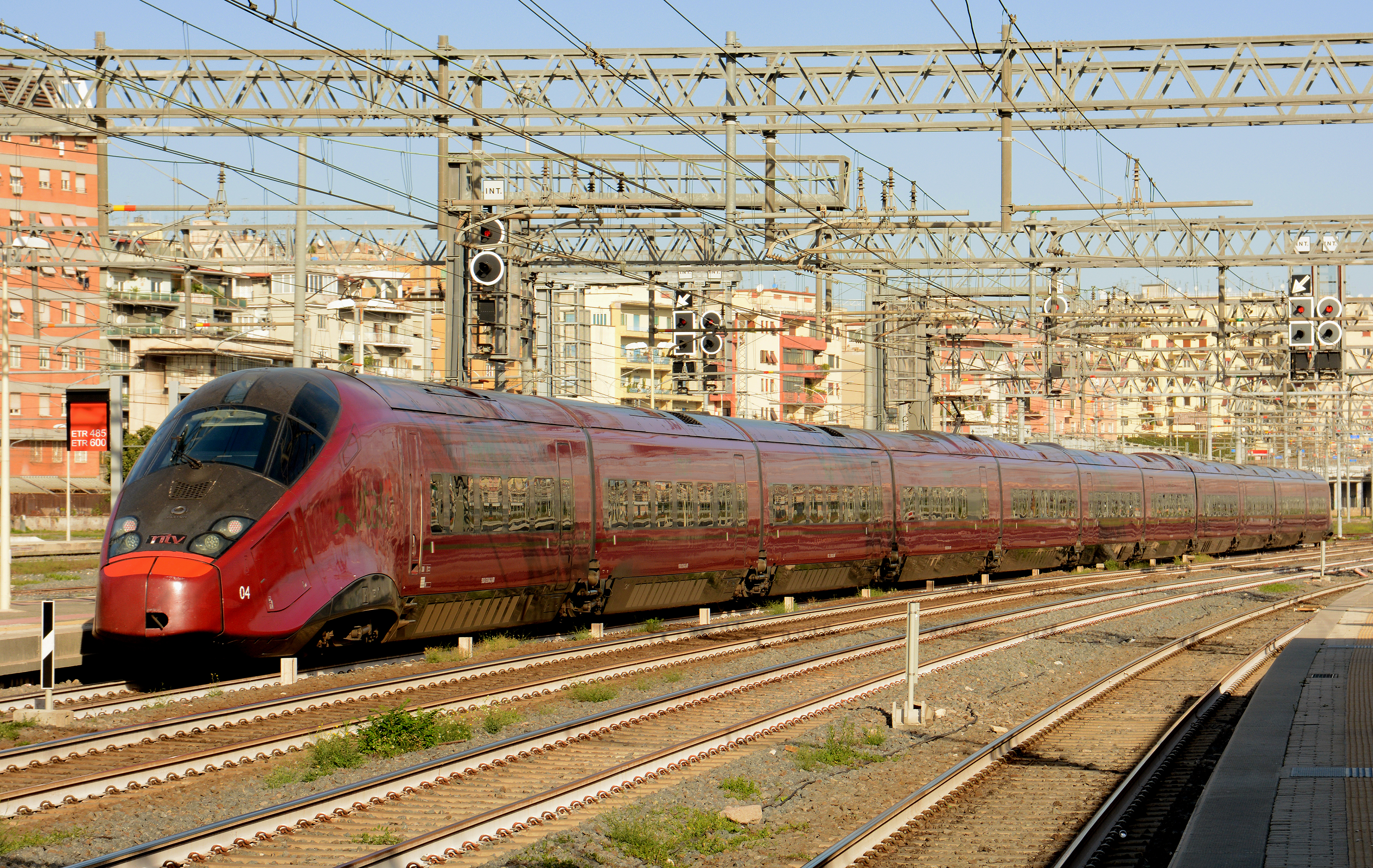
AGV 575 Italo AGV (NTV)

ETR 600 Frecciargento (Trenitalia)

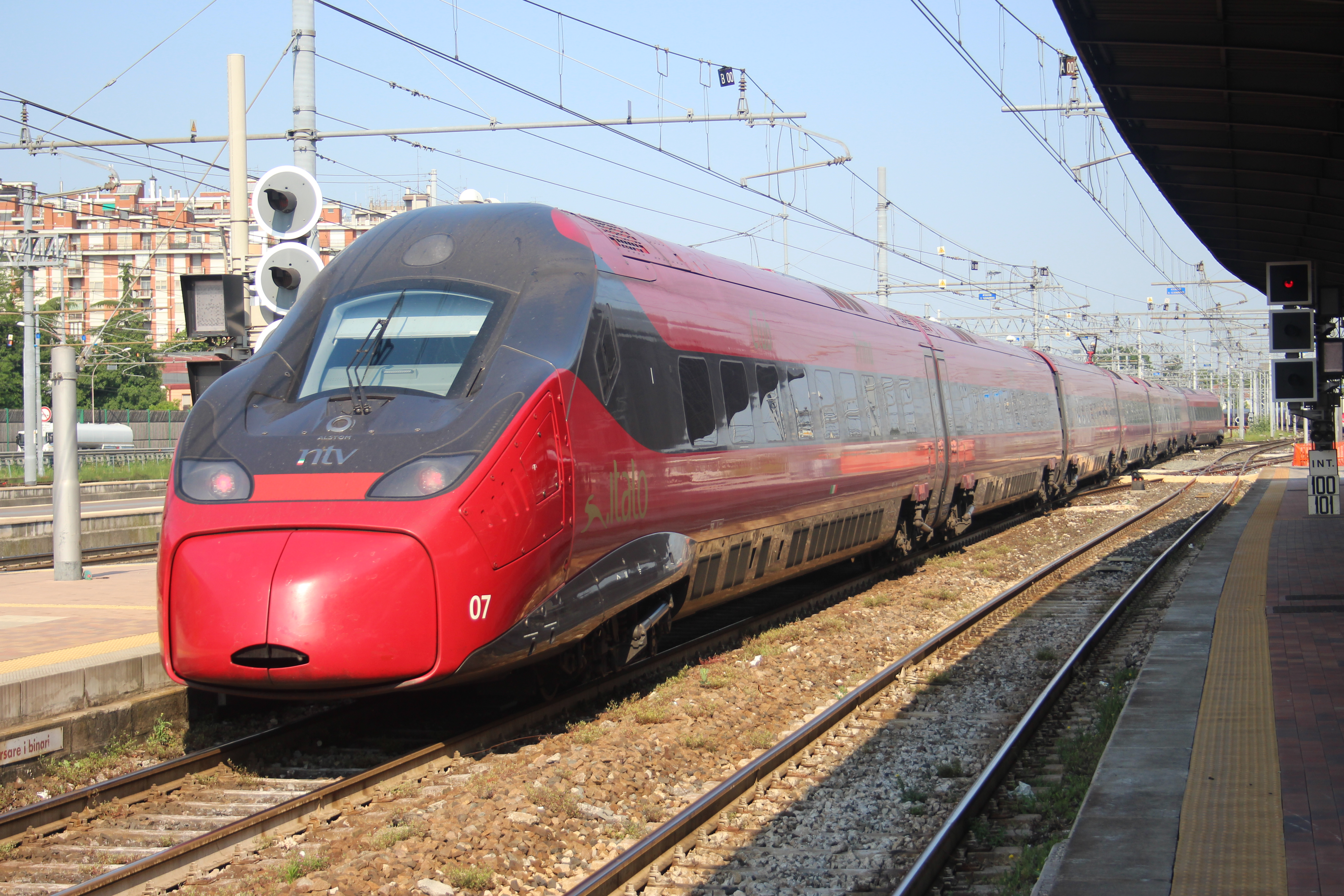
ETR 675 Italo EVO (NTV)

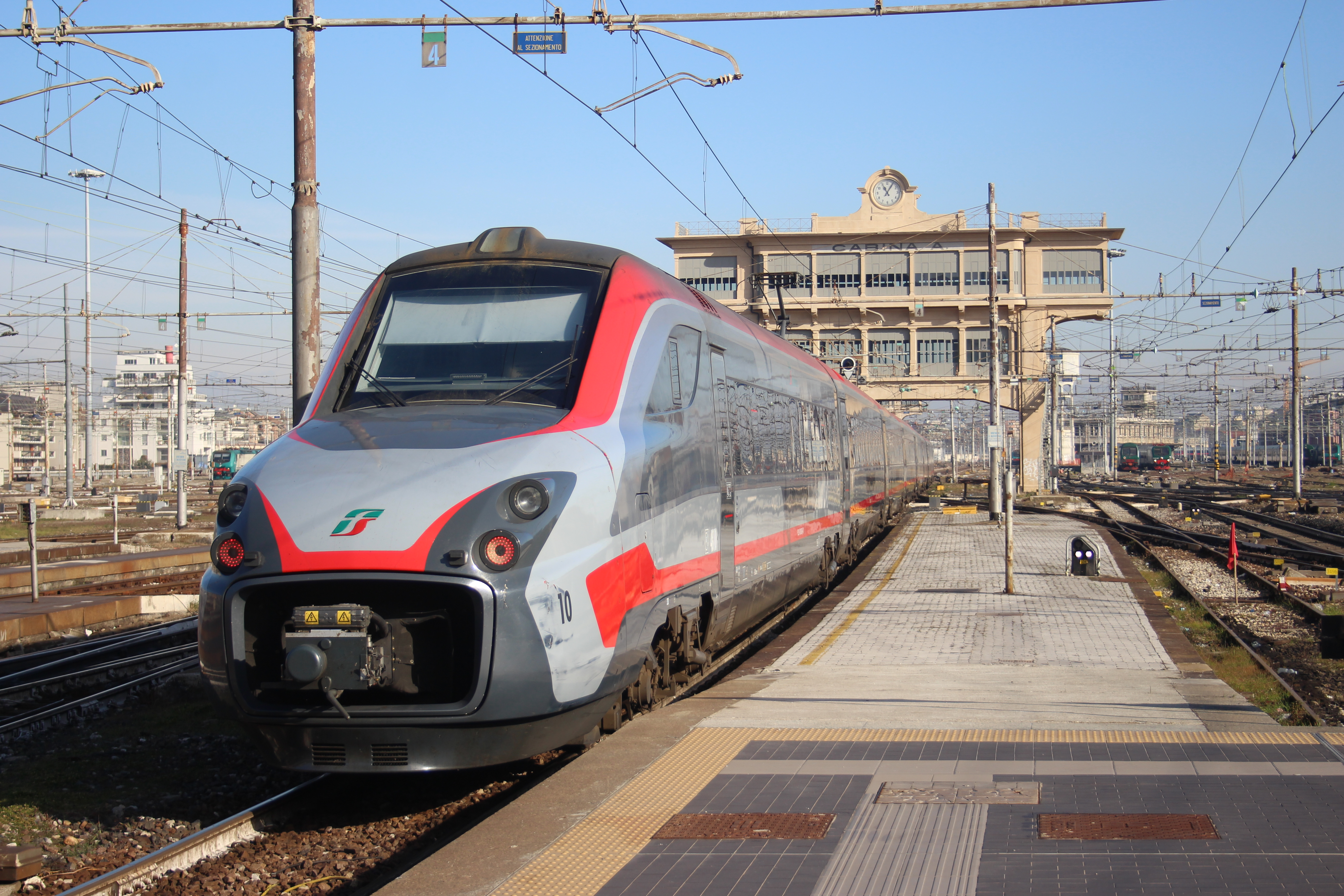
ETR 700 Frecciargento (Trenitalia)

Service on the high speed lines is provided by Trenitalia and the privately owned NTV. Several types of high-speed trains carry out the service:

- AGV 575: non-tilting, it can reach 360 km/h (220 mph) and has an operational speed of up to 300 km/h (190 mph), operated by NTV as Italo;
- ETR 500: non-tilting, it can reach 360 km/h (220 mph), operational speeds up to 300 km/h (190 mph), operated by Trenitalia as the Frecciarossa;
- ETR 1000: non-tilting, operated by Trenitalia as the Frecciarossa 1000, it can reach 400 km/h (250 mph) and has operational speed of 300 km/h (190 mph).
- ETR 485, tilting, speeds up to 250 km/h (160 mph), operated by Trenitalia as the Frecciargento. It operates mainly on traditional lines;
- ETR 600, tilting, speeds up to 250 km/h (160 mph), operated by Trenitalia as the Frecciarossa. It operates on routes that include relatively long sections on traditional lines, but also high-speed ones;
- ETR 610: tilting, speeds up to 250 km/h (160 mph), operated by Trenitalia on EuroCity trains between Italy and Switzerland together with Giruno trainsets;
- ETR 675: non-tilting, operated by NTV as Italo;
- ETR 700: non-tilting, speeds up to 250 km/h (160 mph), operated by Trenitalia as Frecciarossa mostly on routes consisting of sections on both traditional and high-speed lines.

Current limitations on the tracks set the maximum operating speed of the trains at 300 km/h (190 mph) after plans for 360 km/h (220 mph) operations were cancelled. Development of the ETR 1000 by AnsaldoBreda and Bombardier Transportation (which is designed to operate commercially at 360 km/h (220 mph), with a technical top speed of over 400 km/h (250 mph), is proceeding, with Rete Ferroviaria Italiana working on the necessary upgrades to allow trains to speed up to 360 km/h (220 mph). On 28 May 2018, the Ministry of Infrastructure and Transport and the National Association for Railway Safety decided not to run the 385 km/h (240 mph) tests required to allow commercial operation at 350 km/h (220 mph), thus limiting the maximum commercial speed on the existing Italian high-speed lines to 300 km/h (190 mph) and cancelling the project.

TGV trains also run on the Paris–Turin–Milan service, but do not use any high-speed line in Italy.

== Network ==
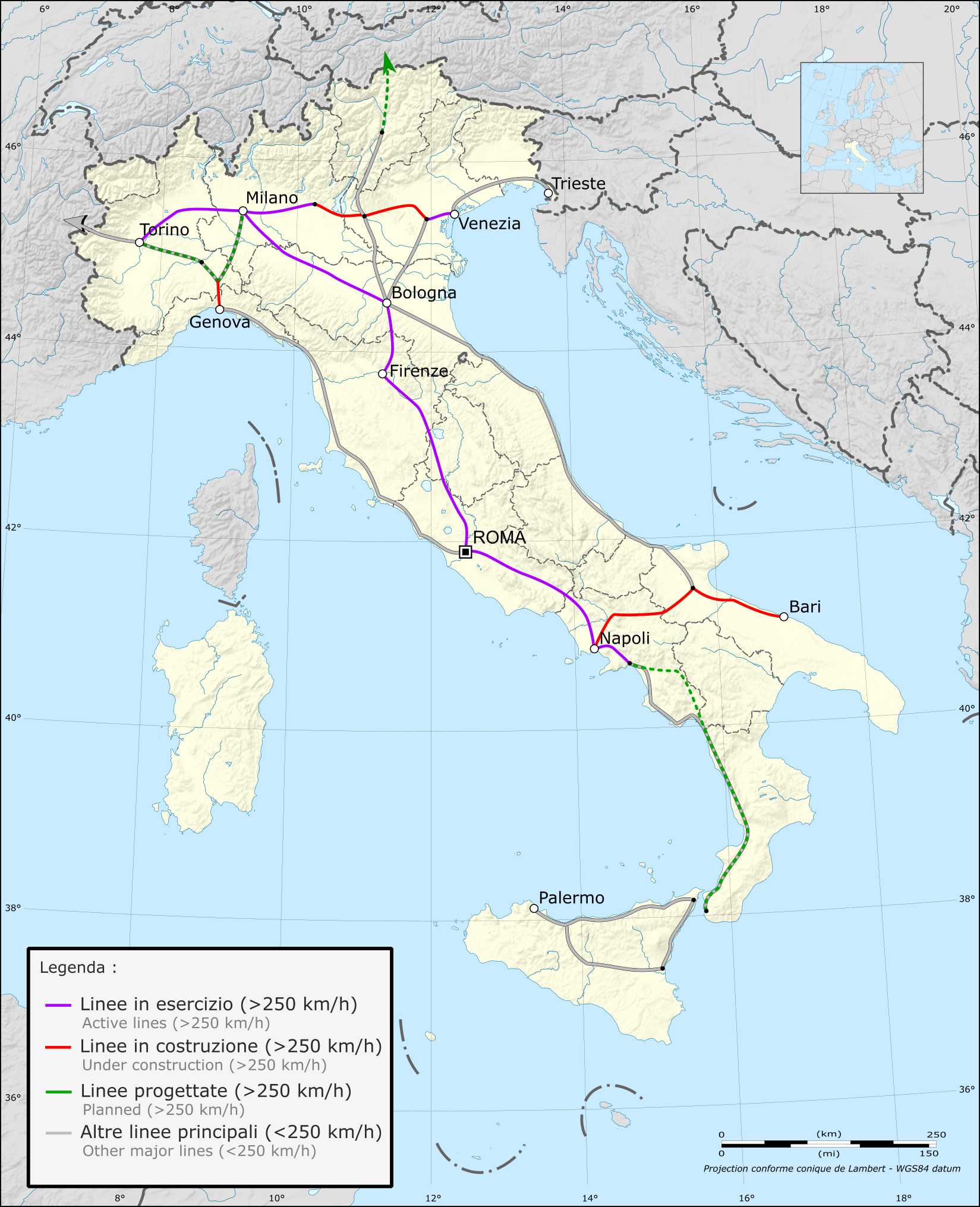
Map of Italian high-speed and higher speed rail network

The following high-speed rail lines are in use.

| Line | Length | Opening | Travel time | Top speed | Voltage |
|---|---|---|---|---|---|
| Milan–Bologna | 215 km (134 mi) | 13 December 2008 | 0:53 | 300 km/h (185 mph) | 25 kV 50 Hz |
| Bologna–Florence | 79 km (49 mi) | 5 December 2009 | 0:35 | 300 km/h (185 mph) | 25 kV 50 Hz |
| Florence–Rome "Direttissima" | 254 km (158 mi) | 24 February 1977 / 26 May 1992 | 1:18 | 250 km/h (155 mph) | 3 kV DC |
| Rome–Naples | 205 km (127 mi) | 19 December 2005 / 13 December 2009 | 1:08 | 300 km/h (185 mph) | 25 kV 50 Hz |
| Naples–Salerno "via Linea Monte Vesuvio" (L.M.V.) | 29 km (18 mi) | 15 April 2008 | 0:30 | 250 km/h (155 mph) | 3 kV DC |
| Turin–Milan | 125 km (78 mi) | 10 February 2006 (Turin–Novara); 13 December 2009 (Novara–Milan) | 0:44 | 300 km/h (185 mph) | 25 kV 50 Hz |
| Milan–Verona (partly under construction) | 67 km (42 mi) | 10 June 2007 (Milano–Treviglio); 11 December 2016 (Treviglio–Brescia) | 0:36 | 200 km/h (125 mph) (Milano–Treviglio); 300 km/h (185 mph) (Treviglio–Brescia) | 3 kV DC; 25 kV 50 Hz |
| Padua–Venice (Mestre) | 25 km (16 mi) | 1 March 2007 | 0:14 | 220 km/h (135 mph) | 3 kV DC |
| Total | 999 km | | | | |

The table shows minimum and maximum (depending on stops) travel times.

| | Bologna | Florence | Milan | Naples | Rome | Turin |
|---|---|---|---|---|---|---|
| Bologna | – | 0:35 | 0:53 | 3:15 (3:35) | 1:54 (2:03) | 2:02 |
| Florence | 0:35 | – | 1:31 | 2:31 (2:51) | 1:18 (1:45) | 2:38 |
| Milan | 0:53 | 1:31 | – | 3:50 (4:18) | 2:40 (3:08) | 0:44 (1:00) |
| Naples | 3:15 (3:35) | 2:31 (2:51) | 3:50 (4:18) | – | 1:08 | 5:00 (5:25) |
| Rome | 1:54 (2:35) | 1:18 (1:45) | 2:40 (3:08) | 1:08 | – | 3:48 |
| Turin | 2:02 | 2:38 | 0:44 (1:00) | 5:00 (5:25) | 3:48 | – |

=== Milan to Salerno Corridor ===
Milan to Salerno is the major north–south corridor of the high-speed network.

The Milan–Bologna segment opened on 13 December 2008. Its construction cost was about 6.9 billion euro. The 182 km (113 mi) line runs parallel to the Autostrada del Sole, crossing seven provinces and 32 municipalities. There are eight connections with historic lines. At the Reggio Emilia interconnection a new station designed by the Valencian architect Santiago Calatrava was opened in June 2013. Calatrava has also designed a signature bridge where the line crosses the A1 motorway. The line travels through a new multi-level station at Bologna (Italy's principal railway junction) designed by Japanese architect Arata Isozaki.

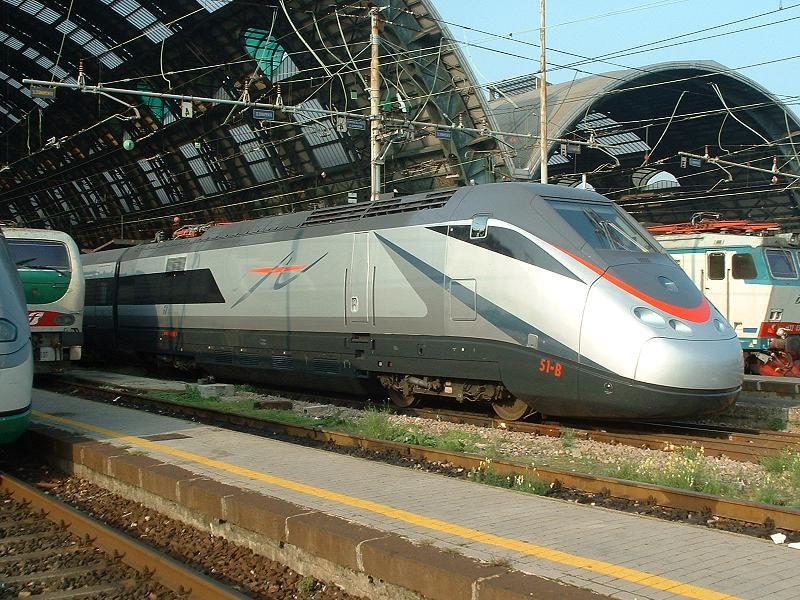
An ETR 500 AV at Milano Centrale railway station. The version ETR 500 Y1 achieved 362 km/h (225 mph) on the Bologna–Florence line on 4 February 2009, a new world speed record in a tunnel.

The Bologna–Florence segment opened on 12 December 2009, allowing a 37-minute journey between the two cities. The Bologna–Florence high-speed section was particularly complex to build mainly because about 93% of its 78.5 km (48.8 mi) runs through tunnels under the Apennines mountain range. The line has nine tunnels, from 600 m (0.37 mi) to 18.5 km (11.5 mi) long, separated by short surface stretches (less than 5 km (3.1 mi) in total). Florence will have a major new multi-level high speed station at Belfiore designed by British architect Norman Foster.

The Florence–Rome segment consists of the older "Direttissima" (literally: most direct) line between the two cities, with a length of 240 km (150 mi). The first high-speed line in Europe, the "Direttissima" was completed in between 1977 and 1992. This segment is being upgraded by Rete Ferroviaria Italiana. Entering Rome, high-speed trains have the option of stopping at either the new intermodal station at Tiburtina, developed by architects ABD Associate led by Paolo Desideri, or Termini station.

The Rome–Naples segment heads south from the Italian capital. Service on the first new high speed segment of the project started in December 2005. This line runs through 61 municipalities in two regions (Lazio and Campania) and connects with the existing national rail network at Frosinone Nord, Cassino Sud and Caserta Nord. On 13 December 2009, work was completed on the last 18 km (11 mi) of the line between Gricignano and Napoli Centrale. In the Campania region, the line passes through Afragola where a major new transfer station has been built, designed by Iraqi-born architect Zaha Hadid.

=== Turin to Trieste Corridor ===
The Turin to Novara segment of the Turin to Trieste corridor runs for 85 km (53 mi) and opened in February 2006. The Novara to Milan segment opened on 12 December 2009, allowing a 59-minute journey between Milan Centrale and Turin Porta Nuova (45 minutes from Milan Porta Garibaldi to Turin Porta Susa). Combined, the two segments are 125 km (78 mi) long, of which 80% (98 km [61 mi]) are in the region of Piemonte (provinces of Turin, Vercelli and Novara) and 20% (27 km [17 mi]) in the region of Lombardy (province of Milan). To minimize its environmental impact on the area, almost the entire length of the Turin to Milan high-speed line was constructed parallel to the A4 Turin-Milan motorway.

The Milan to Venice segment includes stretches from Padua to Mestre (for Venice), in service since March 2007, and Milan to Brescia, which runs alongside the A35 motorway and opened for service on 11 December 2016. Between Brescia and Verona the new high-speed line will parallel the A4 motorway for 30 km (19 mi) of its 48 km (30 mi) total length, and a 7.4 km (4.6 mi) tunnel will be constructed at Lonato del Garda. This section was scheduled for completion in 2023. The final 75 km (47 mi) stretch between Verona and Padua will be constructed by quadrupling the existing railway. The contract for this was let in August 2020 with completion scheduled for 2027. The section between Verona and Vicenza is to be constructed first.

== Lines under construction ==
=== Milan–Genoa ===
A line from Milan to Genoa was approved in 2006 at €6.2 billion; construction work started in 2011. The railway, currently 2 tracks with speeds up to 160km/h, will be doubled to 4 tracks with speeds up to 180km/h between Milano Rogoredo station and the entrance of the new base tunnel. The latter will have an operational speed of 250km/h. Work between Genoa and Tortona was temporarily halted due to funding problems, but restarted in 2019 and now is expected to be completed by 2029.

As of September 2025, only the section between Milano Rogoredo and Pieve Emanuele was under construction.

=== Milan–Venice ===
On the line from Milan to Venice high-speed trains still have to use the conventional line between Brescia and Padua. The remaining portion from Brescia to Padua is under construction at a cost of €9.82 billion, while the rest of the line is already in operation. The line is built for a speed of 250 km/h (160 mph). The section between Brescia and Verona will be completed in 2026 while construction should finish on the section between Verona and Padua in 2029, including a 7.7 km (4.8 mi) tunnel between Lonato del Garda and Desenzano del Garda.

=== Naples–Bari ===
The construction of the line from Naples to Bari began in 2015 and will cut Naples–Bari journeys from four to two hours. Totaling €6.2 billion for the whole project, the final €2.1 billion needed to complete the project was approved in 2019. The completion of the line is projected for 2027.

=== Palermo–Catania ===
Palermo and Catania, Sicily's largest cities, are currently connected by a single-track railway which limits speed and capacity of the line. Currently works are under way to achieve higher speeds and a double-track layout, with the first section of 38 km (24 mi) being under construction between Bicocca and Catenanuova. This will enable a higher maximum speed of 200 km/h (124 mph) compared to the current 90 km/h (56 mph). Construction started in 2019 at a cost of €415 million. The work on both tracks is expected to finish in 2023. Eventually, further improvements as part of the entire €8 billion project will enable a maximum speed of 250 km/h (155 mph) on the line. The upgrade of the line will reduce the journey time between Palermo and Catania to one hour and 45 minutes in 2025, saving one hour.

=== Turin–Lyon ===
The Turin–Lyon line will connect Turin, Lyon and Chambéry, and join the Italian and the French high speed rail networks. It would take over the role of the current Fréjus railway. The project costs €26 billion, with the Mont d'Ambin Base Tunnel, a 57.5 km (35.7 mi) trans-alpine tunnel between Italy and France, costing €18.3 billion. Although the plan was highly controversial, the Italian senate approved funding in mid-2019, with the project tentatively due to be completed in 2032.

=== Verona–Innsbruck ===
The Brenner Base Tunnel will link Verona, Innsbruck, and Munich, and thus connect the Italian, Austrian and German railways. The tunnel is the most important link in a series of projects that will create a single connection from Berlin in Germany to Palermo in Sicily as part of the Trans-European Transport Networks. The tunnel crosses the border between Innsbruck in Austria and Franzensfeste in Italy. The total costs of the tunnel are estimated at €8.4 billion, of which 40% is co-financed in equal measure by Italy and Austria and 50% by the European Union. As of 2020, half of the tunnel's length has been excavated and it is due to be opened in 2032.

A new high speed line between Verona and Fortezza is constructed on the Italian side and is about 180 km (110 mi) long, including 15.4 km (9.6 mi) long Schalderer Tunnel. The line will have a design speed of 200–250 km/h (125–155 mph) and will quadruple the current two tracks of the existing low speed line. It has been budgeted at approximately €5 billion and is expected to be completed by the end of the works on the Brenner Base Tunnel.

=== Salerno–Reggio Calabria ===
A line from Salerno to Reggio Calabria has begun construction with the first TBM launched February 2025 on a tunnel section between Battipaglia and Romagnano. The line is expected to be operational by 2030. The new line will be 445 km (277 mi) long and cost €22.8 billion. It will reduce the travel time from Rome to Reggio Calabria to three hours and forty minutes. This compares to five hours of current travel time for the existing railway between Salerno and Reggio Calabria, excluding the section between Rome and Salerno.

The project is divided into seven functional lots:

1. Salerno–Battipaglia
2. Battipaglia–Praia a Mare
3. Praja a Mare–Tarsia
4. Tarsia–Montalto Uffugo
5. Montalto Uffugo–Lamezia Terme
6. Lamezia Terme–Gioia Tauro
7. Gioia Tauro–Reggio Calabria

== See also ==
- Ferrovie dello Stato Italiane
- Nuovo Trasporto Viaggiatori
- Railway stations in Italy
- Rete Ferroviaria Italiana
- Trenitalia
- Treno Alta Velocità
- Eurostar Italia
