= Napoli Afragola railway station =

High-speed railway station in Naples, Italy

Napoli Afragola
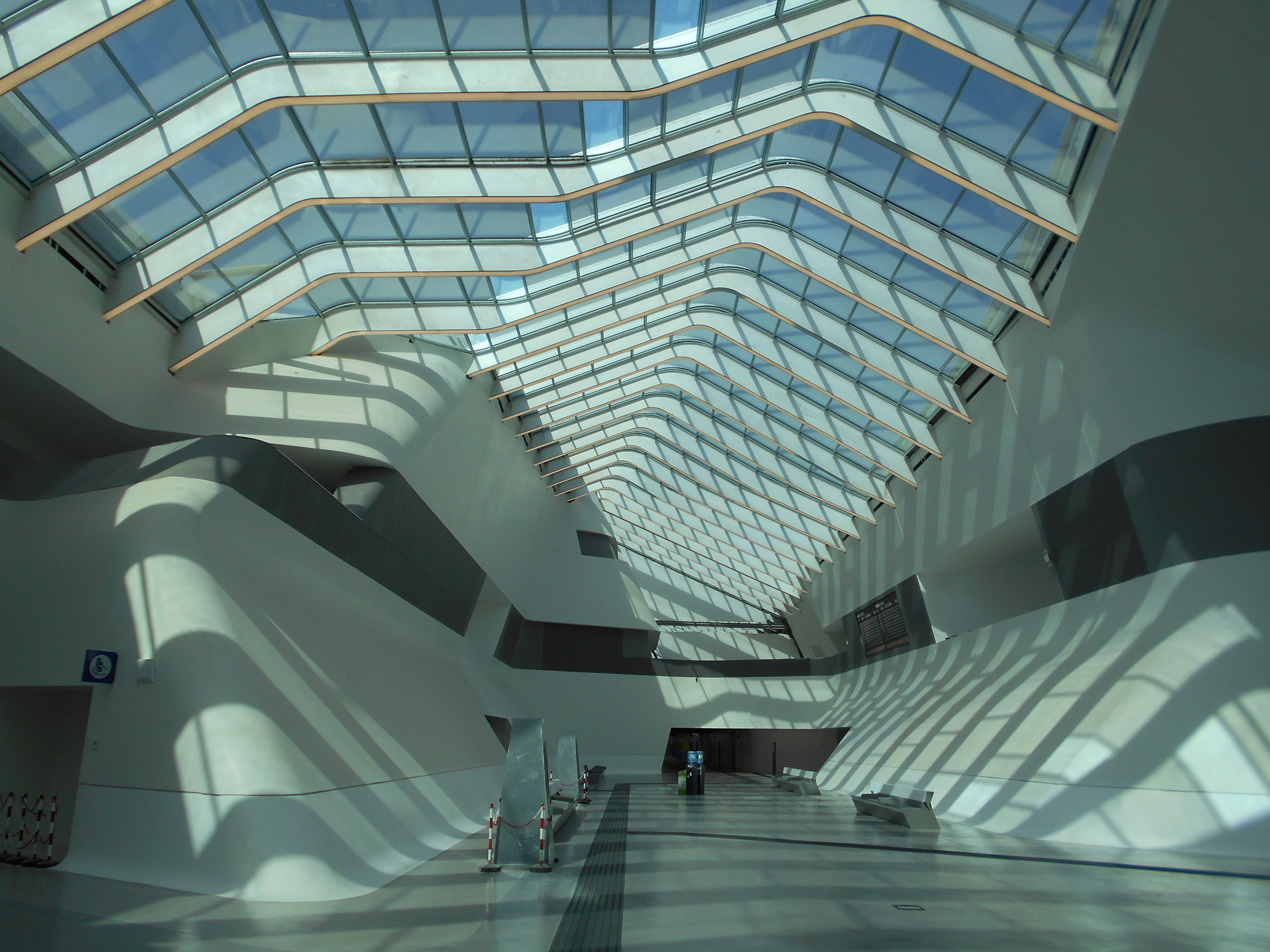
- High speed train station

General information
- Location: Via Arena; Afragola 80021 (Metropolitan City of Naples); Italy
- Coordinates: 40°55′53″N 14°19′52″E
- Owner: Rete Ferroviaria Italiana
- Operator: Trenitalia; Italo Nuovo Trasporto Viaggiatori; EAV
- Lines: Rome–Naples high-speed railway; Naples–Salerno high-speed railway; Rome–Cassino–Naples railway
- Platforms: 2 side platforms, 1 island platform
- Tracks: 7
- Connections: Naples Metro Line 10; Urban and suburban buses

Construction
- Structure type: at-grade, crossing station
- Architect: Zaha Hadid

Other information
- IATA code: NHR
- Fare zone: Unico Campania: NA2

History
- Opened: 6 June 2017; 9 years ago

Passengers
- 1 million per year
Location
- Location within Campania Location within Southern Italy Location within Italy

Naples Afragola (Italian: Stazione di Napoli Afragola) is a railway station near Naples that was inaugurated on 6 June 2017, with regular traffic for passengers starting from 11 June 2017. The station is located in the city of Afragola, in the Naples metropolitan area, and was developed to serve all high-speed trains on the Rome–Naples high-speed line, aside from those that do start or finish at Napoli Centrale station, but instead operate over the Naples–Salerno high-speed line.

Napoli Afragola station was conceived of under a wider plan calling for 13 new stations at various sections along Italy's existing high-speed rail network. Designed by British-Iraqi architect Zaha Hadid, Afragola station, nicknamed the ‘Gateway to the South’, is considered a major transport hub and regional gateway for Naples, operating as a major rail interchange for Italy's southern region, serving four individual high-speed lines, intercity services, and local and regional commuter routes operated by Trenitalia and EAV.

== History ==
=== Construction and opening ===
Italian state railway operator Rete Ferroviaria Italiana (RFI) developed the station. In 2003, a contract was awarded to architect Zaha Hadid Architects for the station design. On 4 November 2003, Zaha Hadid formally presented the design, then projected to open in 2009. The project was delayed in part due to budgetary shortfalls. At one stage, RFI had awarded the €59.5 million contract for the station's construction to a consortium, but subsequent disputes over the price caused RFI to reissue its call for offers. Construction activity was stop-and-go through early 2015. In February 2015, a new construction contract was awarded to the multinational construction firm Astaldi.

On 6 June 2017, five days ahead of its official opening, the first stage of Napoli Afragola was inaugurated in a ceremony attended by the Italian Prime Minister Paolo Gentiloni, who commented on its purpose: “Any great country needs great projects that are a leap forward...The new station at Afragola is the foundation of the infrastructure programme to promote economic development in the south.” Since 11 June, the station has been served by 36 high-speed trains each day; of these, 18 are Frecciarossas operated by the state rail company Trenitalia and 18 are Italos by the privately owned open access company NTV. These have been projected to carry a combined 10,000 passengers daily. Further services are to be added to the station, such as a planned increase to 28 trains in either direction, once additional infrastructure work in the region has been completed; phase two of the station is scheduled to be completed during 2022, to coincide with the opening of the Naples-Bari high speed line.

On 30 June 2026, the reconstruction of the variant section of the Naples–Cancello stretch of the Rome–Cassino–Naples railway was completed, allowing the station to be served by local public transport trains. This section is shared by both the Rome via Cassino railway and the new Naples–Bari high-speed line. The historic stretch with level crossings was decommissioned, along with the stations of Casalnuovo and Acerra, which were replaced by two new stations: one in the San Marco area and one, with an interchange with the Circumvesuviana, in the locality of Spiniello. A new stop is also planned in the locality of Marziasepe, within the shopping centre located there.

== Station layout ==
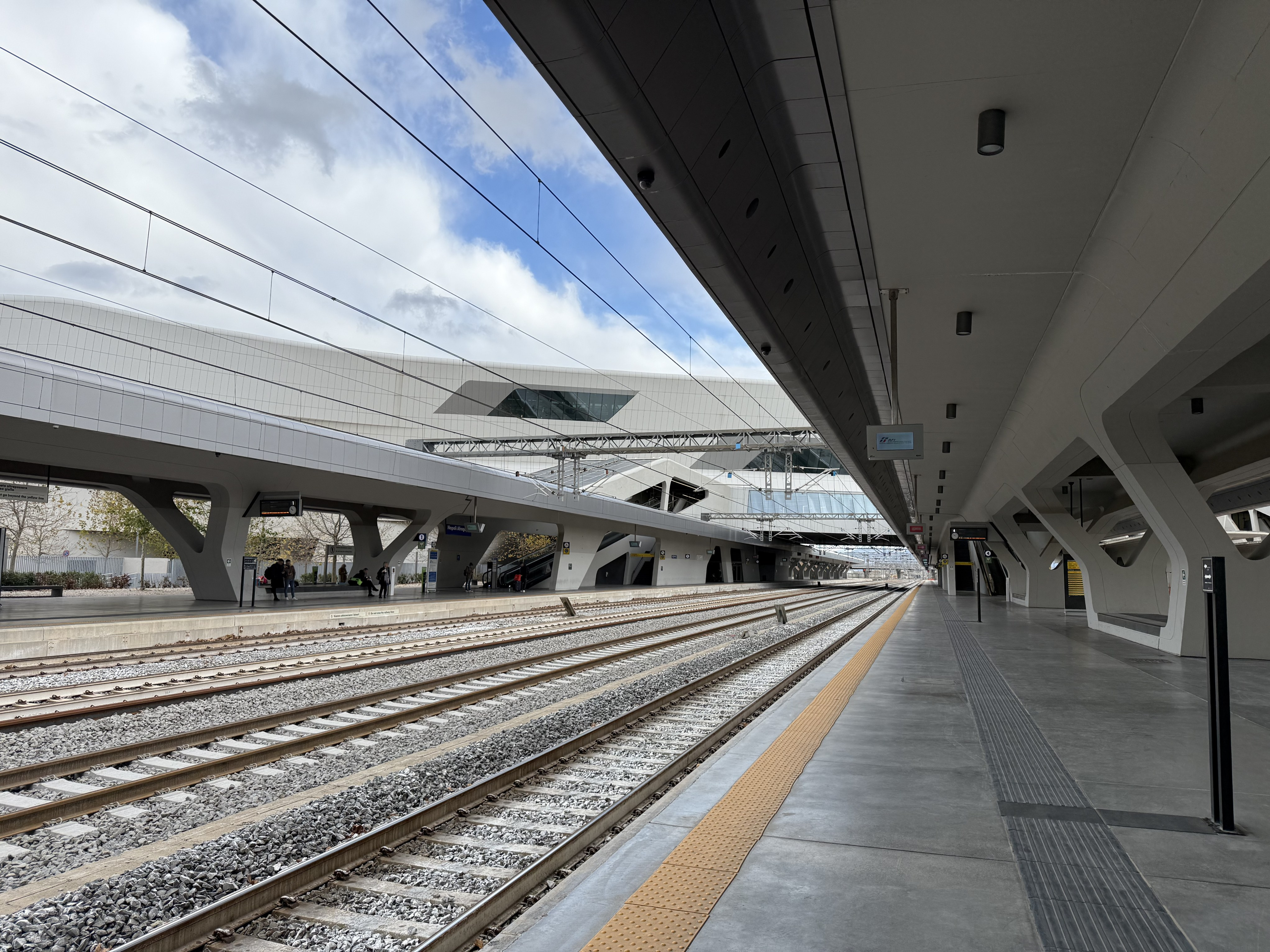
The platform

From its inception the building was envisioned as a bridge over its four tracks, with four levels and a maximum height of 25 metres (82 ft). Accommodating the station's concourse, the bridge has an area of 20,000 square metres (220,000 sq ft), as well as provision for an additional 10,000 square metres (110,000 sq ft). Placing the concourse directly above each platform minimizes passenger walking, without prioritizing the communities at one end of the station over the other.

The station design responds to its adjacent business park and landscape, to encourage further nearby development. The four-level station incorporates public amenities, retail outlets, and waiting areas while remaining spacious and open; the space above the main waiting area accommodates restaurants, bars and stores, as well as a bus station and 1,400 parking spaces.

The exterior features large glass panels forming winding shapes, described as evoking a moving train.

To adapt the station to its context, it includes views of the nearby Mount Vesuvius. The design addressed seismic requirements by dividing the building into zones no greater in length than 50 m (160 ft); enabling the sections to move individually in a seismic event.

Considerable attention was paid to the station's overall environmental design, which was developed by engineering practice Max Fordham. Reportedly, a key objective of the structure was to have minimised energy consumption, favour passive operations over active interventions, and as little environmental impact as possible, in both the construction and operational phases. One major example of this design attention is the glazed roof, which features internal shading and acoustic baffles, limiting the amount of direct sunlight and glare on the concourse as well directing excess heat away via purpose-built roof vents; this enabled natural ventilation practices to be used under normal conditions. While mechanical ventilation systems are also present in the building, such as the roof-level extractor fans, these are intended to be used only during the extremes of summer and winter. Wherever realistically possible, passive means of environmental regulation were used. This includes cooling with ground water. Benches are actively cooled for comfort.

The active tracks, especially those of the Rome-Naples high-speed line, also presented challenges in both the planning and construction processes, although the speeds on these lines were limited to 160 km/h (99 mph) while traversing the construction area. During the construction phase, the presence of the operating high-speed lines split the site into two separate and somewhat disconnected zones; materials and equipment had to be transported between either side via an existing ring road, while an existing underpass served as a pedestrian crossing for workers. In order to protect the high speed line from potential disruption during the work, a temporary roof structure composed of steel elements and a metal sheet topping, was set up around it. The building of scaffolding decks, overpass beams and other elements of the upper levels of the station, had to be built with consideration for the operational electrification system of the running lines, somewhat complicating the work.

The curved structural elements of the station building were constructed using technologies developed and previously deployed by the architecture firm. These were formed primarily of concrete, which had been supported and shaped by prefabricated steel units combined with temporary moulds created by CNC-milling, allowing for complex shapes, durability and strength. Building Information Modelling (BIM) was adopted as a support tool, while 3D modeling proved useful for communicating process information within the technical office and with third parties.

20,000 square metres (220,000 ft^{2}) of matte cladding was installed. A total of 5,000 tonnes (4,900 long tons; 5,500 short tons) of steel were required for the scaffolding decks and curved roofs, while 200 km (120 mi) of cabling and more than 2,000 LED lights were installed across 4,000 m (13,000 ft) of lighting tubes, which were integrated into the steel roof beams. On a stage, there were 330 workers on site daily, peaking at 700.

== See also ==
- History of rail transport in Italy
- List of railway stations in Naples
- List of railway stations in Campania
- Railway stations in Italy
