= Miano station =

Metro station in Naples

Miano

General information
- Coordinates: 40.8898°N 14.2514°E
- System: Naples Metro station
- Owner: City of Naples
- Operator: ANM
- Line: Line 1
- Connections: Urban and suburban buses

Construction
- Architect: Antonio Nanu

Other information
- Status: Under construction

Services
Preceding station	Naples Metro	Following station
Piscinola Scampia Terminus	Line 1	Terminus
Route map
- (*) Planned (**) Under construction
Location

Miano is a Naples Metro station under construction that will serve Line 1.

== Station ==
In the station's atrium, seven contemporary artworks are installed.

The artistic theme revolves around the natural elements — earth, water, air, and fire. Specifically, Miano was assigned the element earth, Regina Margherita water, Secondigliano fire, and Di Vittorio air. The main color of the station is green.

== See also ==
- List of Naples Metro stations
