= Naples–Salerno high-speed railway =

Key southern Italian transport link

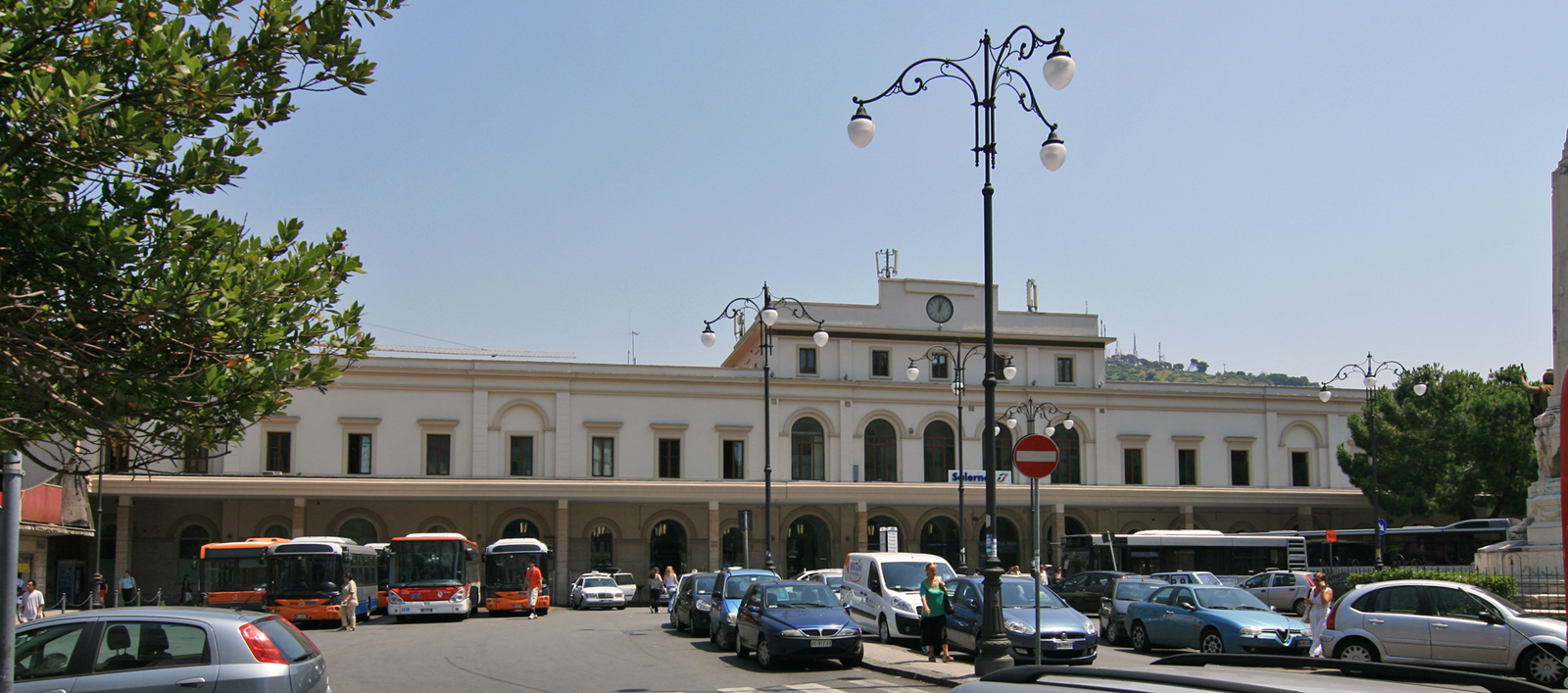
- Salerno railway station

Overview
- Native name: Linea a monte del Vesuvio
- Status: Operational
- Owner: RFI
- Locale: Italy
- Termini: Napoli Afragola; Salerno

Service
- Type: Heavy rail
- System: Italian high-speed rail
- Operator(s): Rete Ferroviaria Italiana (RFI)

History
- Opened: June 2008

Technical
- Line length: 29 km (18 mi)
- Number of tracks: 2
- Track gauge: 1,435 mm (4 ft 8 1/2 in)
- Electrification: 3000 V DC
- Operating speed: 250 km/h (155 mph)

The Naples–Salerno high-speed railway line (also known in Italian as the Linea a Monte del Vesuvio, meaning the "line up Mount Vesuvius") is a link in the Italian high-speed rail network opened in June 2008. The 29-kilometre-long (18 mi) line is one of the new high-speed lines being built to strengthen rail transport system in Italy and in particular freight and passenger transport in Campania. The line is part of Corridor 1 of the European Union's Trans-European high-speed rail network, which connects Berlin and Palermo.

== Route and features ==
The infrastructure of the new line was completed in April 2008 with its electrification, which operates at 3 kV DC, not the 25 kV AC used on most new high-speed railways in Italy. It became available for training in May 2008 and for public operations in the following month. The line allows the reduction of congestion of rail traffic on the Naples–Salerno coast line, as trains can travel on the new line.

The new line starts at Roma Est junction, which allows trains from the Rome–Naples high-speed line to continue south on a branch to Casoria junction where there is a link with the main rail node of Naples. The line passes the towns of Volla, Pomigliano d'Arco, Sant'Anastasia, Somma Vesuviana, Nola, Ottaviano, San Gennaro Vesuviano, Palma Campania, Poggiomarino and Striano, through a series of small cut-and-cover tunnels and elevated sections, reaching the commune of San Valentino Torio, where it currently connects at Sarno junction to the end of the line from Sarno.

The Italian government announced in an economic statement in July 2004 that a future high-capacity line would be built from the end of the line at San Valentino Torio to Battipaglia to create a four-track line through Salerno to Battipaglia as part of a project to build a high-capacity trunk line to Reggio Calabria.

The new line has allowed high-speed trains to avoid Naples since the opening of the section from Roma Est junction to the new Napoli Afragola station in June 2017. From June 2008, most Trenitalia Eurostar Italia, Intercity and Intercity Plus trains between Naples and Salerno were routed over the new line, allowing an increase in commuter trains on the old coast line under a project to develop a Campania "regional metro".

== Proposed new Vesuvio Est interchange station ==
The Region of Campania and Rete Ferroviaria Italiana (RFI, the owner of the rail network) have identified the site for the construction of a new passenger station called "Vesuvio Est" (Vesuvius East) in the commune of Striano, which will allow passengers to interchange with the Circumvesuviana Naples–Ottaviano–Sarno railway line. On 30 March 2007 an international competition was launched for the preliminary and final design of the station with a prize of €1,245,000. The estimated cost of the new station is €32.5 million and according to the agreement between Campania and RFI was planned to be completed in 2008 or 2009. The station will have an area of 10,000 square metres (110,000 sq ft) indoors and 50,000 square metres (540,000 sq ft) in total. Its catchment area will be the Agro Nocerino Sarnese area and the area south-east of Mount Vesuvius, which have a total population of 742,000. It will offer fast connections with Salerno and Naples and eventually with Rome, Battipaglia and Reggio di Calabria. RFI (Rete Ferroviaria Italiana) announced in 2010 January 22 that it had selected the Italian-Belgian group led by Samyn and Partners architects and engineers to design the proposed Vesuvio Est high speed station on the Napoli – Salerno route. According to RFI estimates, the new station will be served by about 196 trains a day (52 long distance trains and 144 Circumvesuviana trains, a train every 15 minutes) and will be used by about 10,000 passengers per day, including 2,000 in the peaks. It is expected that about 1,500 non-travellers will go to the station for other reasons as it is planned to provide space for commercial uses, banking, a post office and restaurants. It is proposed to build a 1,000 place car park and areas for taxis and buses to stop; there will also be a possible link with the A30 motorway and the SS268 highway.
