= Rome–Cassino–Naples railway =

Railway line in Italy

The Rome–Cassino–Naples railway is a railway in Italy, the first of the three existing railway lines between the capitals of Latium and Campania to be opened when it was completed by the Società per le strade ferrate romane in 1863. The line is now fully electrified at 3 kV DC. It is now mainly used by regional trains, some trains to and from the Adriatic coast and a few night trains. The Rome–Naples high-speed railway line (which was largely opened on 19 December 2005) generally follows the same route.

== History ==
The first part of the line to be opened was at the southern end, built by the Royal Neapolitan Railway Company and was opened between Naples, Cancello and Caserta on 20 December 1843 and was the second line opened in the Kingdom of the Two Sicilies after the Naples–Portici line opened in 1839. It operated from a terminal at Napoli Porta Nolana, now used by the Circumvesuviana Railway. This line was extended to Capua on 26 May 1844. A branch line was opened from Cancello to Nola in 1846 and extended to Sarno in 1856.

The northern part of the line was opened between a station at Porta Maggiore (southwest of the modern Termini station) and Ciampino on 14 July 1856 as part of the Rome–Frascati line by the Società Pio Latina ("Latin Pius Railway"), a French company named in honour of Pope Pius IX, who had overturned the Vatican's previous opposition to innovations such as railways in the Papal States. This line was extended to the new Roma Termini station on 22 October 1863.

In 1860 the Società Pio Latina and the Società Pio Centrale—the builder of the Rome–Civitavecchia railway, opened in 1859—combined to form the Società per le strade ferrate romane ("Roman Railway Company"), which then absorbed the Royal Neapolitan Railway Company. It opened an 80 kilometres (50 mi) section from Roma Termini to Ceprano–Falvaterra (including the Porta Maggiore–Ciampino section) on 1 December 1862. The 42 kilometres (26 mi) Capua–Tora–Presenzano section had been opened on 14 October 1861 and the final 52 kilometres (32 mi) section between Ceprano–Falvaterra and Tora–Presenzano was opened on 25 February 1863.

As part of the works on the Naples–Bari itinerary, on 31 May 2026 the Naples–Cancello section, which previously included the stations of Casalnuovo and Acerra passing through the centres of the two respective municipalities, was closed; at the same time it was replaced by a new alignment (activated on 30 June 2026) passing through Naples Afragola station and including the new stations and stops of Casalnuovo, Afragola Zona Commerciale and Acerra.

== Branches and connections ==
- Ciampino to Frascati, Albano Laziale and Velletri
- Roccasecca to Avezzano (Roccasecca–Avezzano line)
- Rocca d'Evandro to Isernia and Campobasso (Rocca d'Evandro–Venafro line )
- Vairano-Caianello to Isernia and Campobasso (Termoli–Campobasso–Carpinone–Isernia–Vairano line)
- Sparanise to Gaeta (Sparanise–Gaeta line)—currently suspended
- Santa Maria Capua Vetere to Piedimonte Matese
- Caserta to Benevento and Aversa
- Cancello to Benevento and Salerno

== See also ==
- List of railway lines in Italy
