= Regina Margherita station =

Metro station in Naples, Italy

Coordinates: 40°53′31″N 14°15′40″E

Regina Margherita

General information
- System: Naples Metro station
- Operator: ANM
- Line: Line 1
- Connections: Urban and suburban buses

Other information
- Status: Under construction
Route map
- (*) Planned (**) Under construction
Location

Regina Margherita is a Naples Metro station under construction that will serve Line 1. Regina Margherita station, designed by Antonio Nanu, along with the Miano and Secondigliano stations, will serve the Secondigliano and Miano areas.

== See also ==
- List of Naples metro stations
