= San Marco in Sylvis, Afragola =

Roman catholic church at Naples

Coordinates: 40°55′08.3″N 14°19′26.6″E

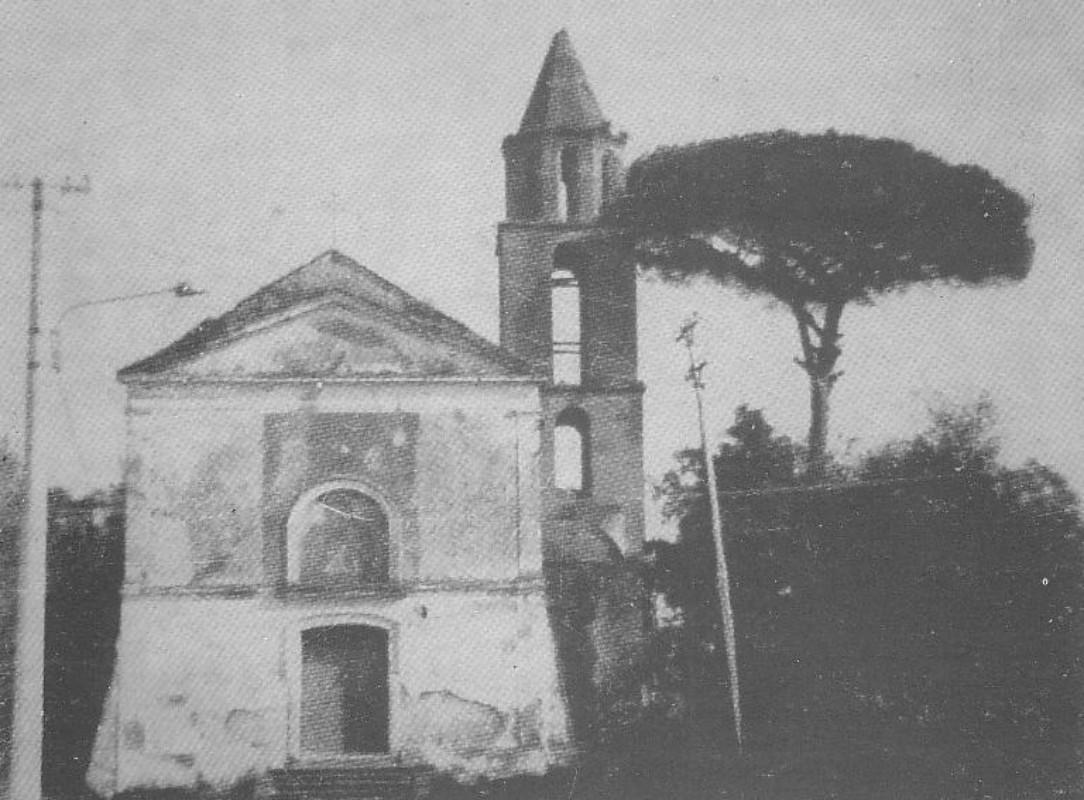
The church San Marco in Sylvis in the 1960s.

San Marco in Sylvis is a Roman Catholic church located in Afragola, Metropolitan city of Naples, region of Campania, Italy.

== History ==
A church at the site is first documented from 1179, patronized by King William II of Sicily. The church has undergone various reconstructions over the centuries, including a major refurbishment in 1563 It contains a series of 16th century frescoes. It putatively contains a stone upon which St Mark sat, which is venerated for its ability to heal the sick through miracles.
