= Secondigliano station =

Metro station in Naples, Italy

Coordinates: 40°53′11″N 14°15′50″E

Secondigliano

General information
- System: Naples Metro station
- Operator: ANM
- Line: Line 1
- Connections: Urban and suburban buses

Other information
- Status: Under construction
Route map
- (*) Planned (**) Under construction
Location

Secondigliano is a Naples Metro station under construction that will serve Line 1. Designed by Antonio Nanu, along with the Miano and Regina Margherita stations, will serve the Secondigliano and Miano areas.

== See also ==
- List of Naples metro stations
