= Afragola =

Afragola Afravola (Neapolitan)
- Comune
- Comune di Afragola
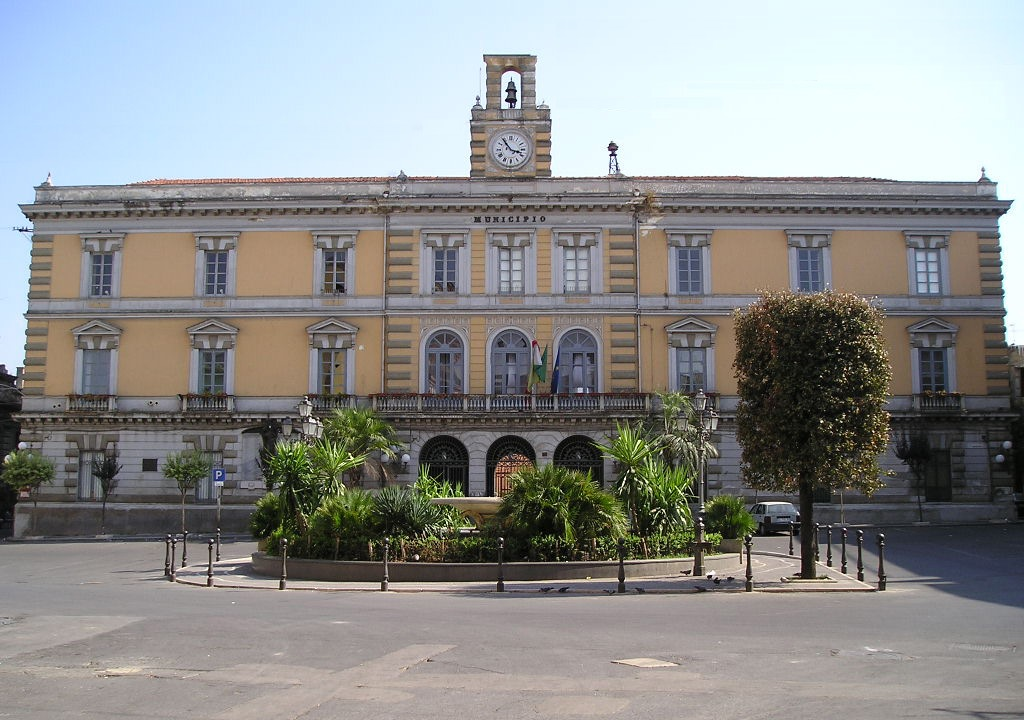
- Afragola City Hall

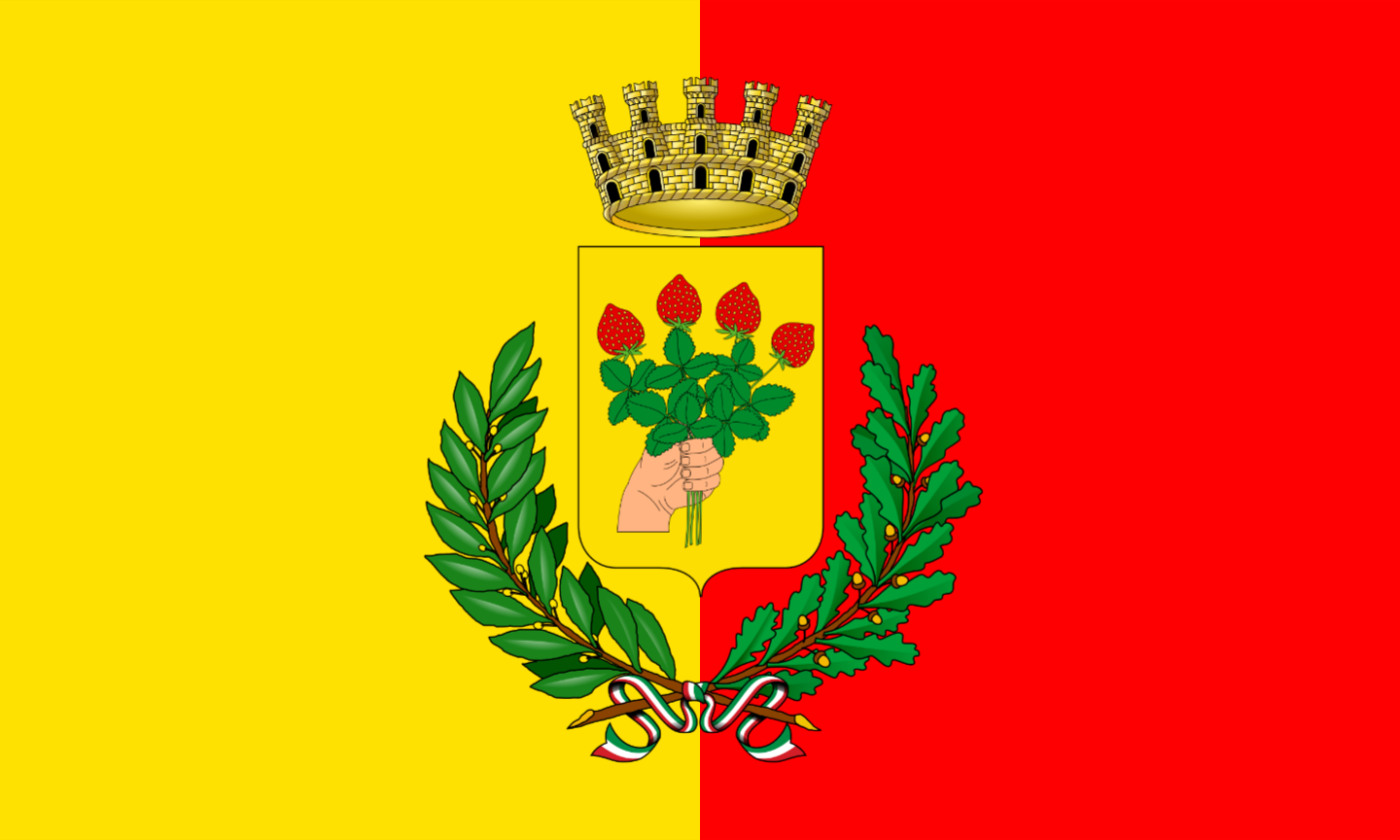
- Flag Coat of arms

- Location of Afragola in Italy Afragola (Campania)
- Coordinates: 40°55′N 14°19′E
- Country: Italy
- Region: Campania
- Metropolitan city: Naples (NA)

Government
  - Mayor: Antonio Pannone

Area
  - Total: 17.91 km^{2} (6.92 sq mi)
- Elevation: 43 m (141 ft)

Population (2026)
  - Total: 61,581
  - Density: 3,438/km^{2} (8,905/sq mi)
- Demonym: Afragolesi
- Time zone: UTC+1 (CET)
  - Summer (DST): UTC+2 (CEST)
- Postal code: 80021
- Dialing code: 081
- Patron saint: St. Anthony of Padua
- Saint day: June 13
- Website: Official website

Afragola (Italian: [afraˈɡoːla]; Neapolitan: Afravola [afraˈvoːlə], locally [afraˈoːrə]) is a city and comune (municipality) in the Metropolitan City of Naples in the region of Campania in southern Italy. It has 61,581 inhabitants.

Afragola borders the municipalities of Acerra, Casalnuovo di Napoli, Caivano, Cardito and Casoria, forming a single conurbation of around 100,000 inhabitants.

== History ==
The area of modern Afragola was already settled in ancient times by the Samnites. Older remains, belonging to an early Bronze Age settlement buried by a Vesuvius eruption in the 19th century BC, were found in 2005.

According to a tradition now recognized as false, the town was founded in the Middle Ages, in 1140, by Roger II of Sicily, who assigned the land to its veterans. It is more likely that the city stemmed from the merger of several villages and churches already existing here. The territory was originally held by the archbishops of Naples, but from 1576 it was directly subjected, as an autonomous community, to the Kings of Naples.

== Demographics ==
As of 2026, the population is 61,581, of which 49.3% are male, and 50.7% are female. Minors make up 18.9% of the population, and seniors make up 17.1%.

Historical population

Year	Pop.	±%
1861	16,074	—
1871	17,543	+9.1%
1881	18,909	+7.8%
1901	21,849	+15.5%
1911	22,548	+3.2%
1921	23,069	+2.3%
1931	27,293	+18.3%
1936	29,281	+7.3%

Year	Pop.	±%
1951	37,477	+28.0%
1961	45,881	+22.4%
1971	50,769	+10.7%
1981	57,367	+13.0%
1991	60,065	+4.7%
2001	62,319	+3.8%
2011	63,820	+2.4%
2021	62,198	−2.5%

Source: ISTAT

=== Immigration ===
As of 2025, immigrants make up 3.6% of the population. The 5 largest foreign countries of birth are Ukraine, Burkina Faso, Morocco, Ghana, and Germany.

== Crime and social issues ==
Afragola is the seat of one of the largest camorra clans of the area, led by Anna Mazza. In 1999 and 2005, the communal council was disbanded by rule of the President of Italian Republic due to mafia allegiance of some of its members.

Along with most of the nearby communes, Afragola also suffers from high pollution rates, as well as a high unemployment rate; unreported employment is also widespread.

== Main sights ==
- Baroque sanctuary-basilica of St. Anthony's sanctuary-basilica. It was begun in 1633 and has a nave with two aisles, internally decorated with marbles. The bell tower was constructed from 1590.
- The castle, documented from 1495, was likely built from around 1420. According to the tradition, it was a residence of queen Joanna II of Naples. It currently houses a childhood school.
- Santa Maria d'Ajello Church, founded in 1190. It houses works by Giovan Angelo Criscuolo, Alessandro Viola (1695) and Angelo Mozzillo.
- San Marco in Sylvis Church, built around 1179. On its external wall is a slab on which, according to the legend, once sat both St. Mark and San Gennaro.
- San Marco all'Olmo Church, built in 1615
- Palazzo Migliore (17th century)
- San Giorgio Martire: Parish church built in 1695–1702

== Transport ==
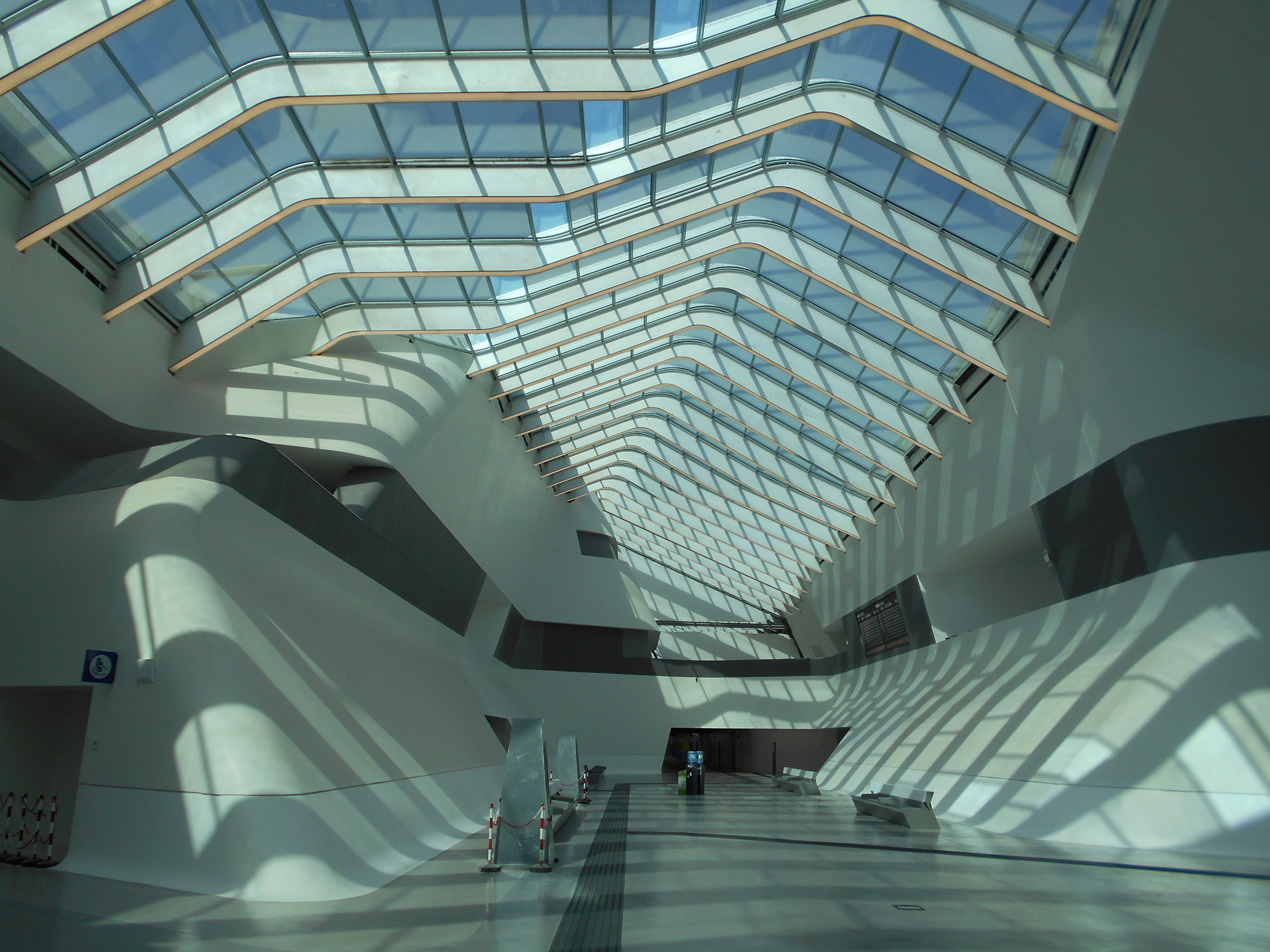
High speed train station designed by Zaha Hadid

Napoli Afragola railway station was designed by the architect Zaha Hadid and opened in 2017. This station is only used by high-speed trains on the Rome–Naples high-speed railway line, which link Afragola to many Italian cities including Bologna, Milan, Florence and Turin.

Afragola's bus network is managed by CTP (the Consorzio Trasporto Pubblico or Public Transport Consortium).

The proposed Line 10 of the Naples Metro will also serve Afragola.
