= Rome–Naples high-speed railway =

Key central Italian transport link

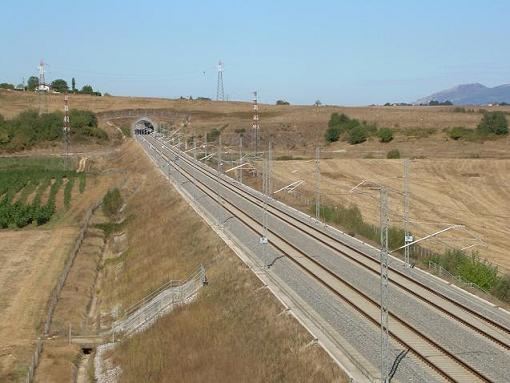
- A straight section line of the line near Anagni

Overview
- Native name: Ferrovia Roma-Napoli (alta velocità)
- Status: Operational
- Owner: Rete Ferroviaria Italiana (RFI)
- Locale: Italy
- Termini: Roma Termini; Napoli Centrale

Service
- Type: Heavy rail
- System: Italian high-speed rail
- Operator(s): Rete Ferroviaria Italiana

History
- Opened: 19 December 2005 completed on 13 December 2009

Technical
- Line length: 204.6 km (127.1 mi)
- Number of tracks: 2
- Track gauge: 1,435 mm (4 ft 8 1/2 in)
- Minimum radius: 5,450 metres (17,880 ft) except for short sections
- Electrification: 25 kV AC
- Operating speed: 300 kilometres per hour (190 mph)
- Signalling: ERTMS/ETCS level 2
- Maximum incline: 2.1%

The Rome–Naples high-speed railway line is one of the railways in the Italian high-speed rail network. Initially opened in December 2005, it is the first railway line in Italy to be electrified at 25 kV AC (instead of traditional 3 kV DC) and the first in the world to use ETCS Level 2 in normal rail operations.

Planning for the high-speed route commenced during the 1980s following its identification as a favourable option for development ahead of several proposed options. During May 1995, following a competitive tender, contracts for the line's construction were awarded to a range of contractors that were collectively known as the IRICAV UNO consortium. Construction of the line involved the boring of 28.3 km (17.6 mi) of tunnels, as 13 percent of the selected route was underground. Despite the geological challenges, the construction process was relatively steady and proceeded to plan. During March 2001, it was announced that all civil engineering works had been completed, fulfilling the agreed schedule and with little divergence in terms of costs.

The first section of the railway, between Roma Termini and Gricignano di Aversa, was opened to traffic on 19 December 2005. The final 25 kilometres (16 miles) from Gricignano to Napoli Centrale opened on 13 December 2009. It is owned and operated by Rete Ferroviaria Italiana (RFI), while the trains running upon the railway are operated by both the state rail company Trenitalia and the privately owned open access company Nuovo Trasporto Viaggiatori (NTV). When the line has been fully completed, trains will typically take 70 minutes to travel between the two cities. The line is part of Corridor 1 of the European Union's Trans-European high-speed rail network, which connects Berlin and Palermo.

== History ==
=== Background ===
During the 1980s, Italian railway planners studied options for the expansion of its fledging high-speed rail network. It was quickly identified that a new railway between Rome and Naples would be particularly desirable amongst the potential options, not least as it would interface with existing lines (such as the existing Florence–Rome high-speed railway) to form a high speed network that better connected the south and north of Italy. The initiative also aligned with European politicians, who recognised the wider strategic value represented of a wider high speed network spanning the majority of regions across the member states of the European Community (later rebranded as the European Union).

Following an extensive surveying effort, a route for the proposed railway was selected; its total length was 204 km (127 mi), of which 13 percent (28.3 km (17.6 mi)) was to run through a series of bored tunnels. Early on, it was decided that the envisioned construction programme ought to be divided into several lots, covering different sections of the railway's route. These were put out to competitive tender, during which bidders submitted detailed design specifications for their proposed civil works. From this process, a number of contracts were awarded to five contractors, these being Pegaso, Icla, Italstrade, Vianini and Condotte. Furthermore, these companies were also collectively appointed as the general contractor for the railway, known as the IRICAV UNO consortium.

=== Construction ===
During May 1995, construction of the railway commenced, immediately following the issuing of the contracts. The majority of the route's complex undertakings were the underground works performed; the majority of boring was driven through volcanic rock that possessed generally favourable properties. Where deformation phenomena was predicted (or detected), various techniques were employed to stabilise the ground, such as the use of shotcrete, fibre glass structural elements, and additional concrete lining where applicable. Several of the lengthier tunnels of the line were accompanied by secondary access tunnels, each large enough to permit their use by road vehicles. Relatively few alterations or remedial works were required during the railway's construction.

By the end of 1999, approximately 21.6 km (13.4 mi) of tunnel had been completed, roughly equivalent to 99% of the railway's underground sections. The average advance rates of these tunnels was typically 20 meters per day, discounting accessory works such as access tunnels and shafts. Some tunnels, such as the Colli Albani and Sgurgola tunnels, had been bored at a relatively fast rate and constant rate, indicative of a good match between the construction techniques applied and the geological conditions present. This outcome likely supported the relatively small divergence between estimated and actual costs incurred by the works. During March 2001, it was announced that all of the railway's civil engineering works had been completed as per schedule.

The longest tunnel on the line through the Alban Hills is 6,725 metres (4 miles) long. The minimum radius of curves is 5,450 metres (5,960 yards) and the centres of the running lines are 5 metres (16 feet 5 inches) apart. The maximum gradient of the line is 21 per thousand.

Between 2004 and 2005, a series of tests was carried out prior to the line being opened for commercial operations, to obtain approval for the line to be regularly operated at up to 300 km/h (186 mph). During these tests, an ETR 500 train achieved a speed of 347 km/h (216 mph), such speeds having been made possible by the line's 25 kV AC railway electrification system (rather than the traditional Italian use of 3 kV DC), and the adoption of new signaling, control and train protection system provided by the European Rail Traffic Management System/European Train Control System (ETCS). It was the first railway line in Italy to be electrified at 25 kV AC at 50 Hz and the first in the world to use ETCS Level 2 in normal rail operations.

=== Opening and post-opening developments ===
The first 193 kilometres (120 miles) of the line was brought into service on 19 December 2005. The new line begins near Roma Prenestina station (4.5 kilometres (2.8 miles) from Roma Termini) and ends at Gricignano di Aversa, where a connecting line leads to the Rome-Naples via Formia line, which is used for the last 25 kilometres (16 miles) to reach Napoli Centrale station. The line features three other interconnections that link with the historical Rome-Naples via Cassino line, near Anagni, Cassino and Caserta. Via its interlinking with other Italian high speed lines, the Rome-Naples line has facilitated a competitive railway connection between Naples and Milan along which the railway has reportedly gained market share in contrast to road and air travel.

On 13 December 2009, work was completed on the last 18 km (11 mi) line of the line between Gricignano and Napoli Centrale. This includes the Napoli Afragola station, which was originally due to be open in 2009 when the construction contract was first awarded, but construction had to be temporarily put on hold while the work was retendered. Thus, construction was delayed on several occasions and did not get fully underway until 2015. It was opened on 6 June 2017, with regular traffic for passengers starting from 11 June 2017.

Since opening, the Afragola Station has been typically served by 36 high-speed trains running upon the line, carrying a projected 10,000 passengers, each day; 18 of these being Frecciarossas operated by the state rail company Trenitalia while the other 18 trains are Italos by the privately owned open access company Nuovo Trasporto Viaggiatori (NTV). A new interchange with the railway shall be formed at Afragola station following the reconstruction of the Circumvesuviana line, which had been reportedly scheduled for completion in 2022.

The Naples–Salerno high-speed railway (also known as the Linea a Monte del Vesuvio—"line up Mount Vesuvius") was completed in June 2008 to allow high-speed trains to and from Salerno and the south to bypass Napoli Centrale station. The length of the high-speed section is about 205 kilometres (127 miles). The connecting line to Gricignano di Aversa is now not used for normal operations.

== See also ==
- List of railway lines in Italy
