= Souček =

Souček (feminine: Součková) is a Czech surname. It is a diminutive of the surname Suk. Notable people with the surname include:

- Andy Soucek (born 1985), Spanish racing driver
- Apollo Soucek (1897–1955), American pilot
- Branko Souček (1930–2014), Croatian academic and computer scientist
- Dan Soucek (born 1969), American politician
- Daniel Souček (born 1998), Czech footballer
- Filip Souček (born 2000), Czech footballer
- Jan Souček (born 1978), Czech canoer
- Jaroslav Souček (1935–2006), Czech opera singer
- Karel Soucek (1947–1985), Czech-Canadian stuntman
- Ladislav Souček (born 1946), Czech canoer
- Laura Soucek (born 1973), Italian scientist
- Ludvík Souček (1926–1978), Czech writer
- Milada Součková (1899–1983), Czech writer
- Stanislava Součková (1923–1997), Czech opera singer
- Svat Soucek, Czech-American historian
- Tomáš Souček (born 1995), Czech footballer
- Zdeněk Souček (1917–1967), Czech-Australian physician and explorer
