= Velim =

Velim may refer to:

- Velim, Goa, a village in India
- Velim (Kolín District), a municipality and village in the Czech Republic
  - Velim test centre, a railway test centre
- Velim, Croatia, a village near Stankovci, Zadar County
