= Suk (name) =

Suk is a both a surname and a given name.

== Surname ==
Suk is a common Czech surname (feminine: Suková). It literally means 'knot in wood', but it originated as a nickname for a stubborn, tough or healthy person. In the Czech lands, the surname was first documented in 1543. A Czech diminutive of Suk is Souček.

The word suk and the surname Suk is derived from Proto-Slavic *sǫkъ and also appears in other Slavic languages, including Russian, Ukrainian and Serbo-Croatian. The Polish equivalent is Sęk.

Suk also appears as a surname in Southeast Asian languages. It is an alternative spelling of the Korean name Seok.

Notable people with the surname include:

- Cyril Suk (born 1967), Czech tennis player
- Feliks Suk (1845–1915), Croatian university professor
- František Janda-Suk (1878–1955), Czech athlete
- Grigoriy Suk (1896–1917), Russian aviator
- Helena Suková (born 1965), Czech tennis player
- Jeannie Suk (born 1973), American-Korean law professor
- Josef Suk (composer) (1874–1935), Czech composer of classical music
- Josef Suk (violinist) (1929–2011), Czech violinist
- Joey Suk (born 1989), Dutch-Indonesian footballer
- Julie Suk (1924–2025), American poet
- Mykola Suk (born 1945), Ukrainian pianist
- Oleh Suk (born 1965), Ukrainian rock musician
- Sao Seng Suk (1935–2007), Shan Burmese leader
- Václav Suk (1861–1933), Czech violinist and composer
- Vávra Suk (born 1973), Czech-born Swedish politician
- Věra Suková (1931–1982), Czech tennis player

== Given name ==
- Suk Bahadur, Burmese footballer
- Suk Bahadur Rai, Burmese Gurkha soldier
- Suk Sam Eng, Cambodian politician
