= Stolpersteine in Ratenice =

Memorial installations in Czech Republic

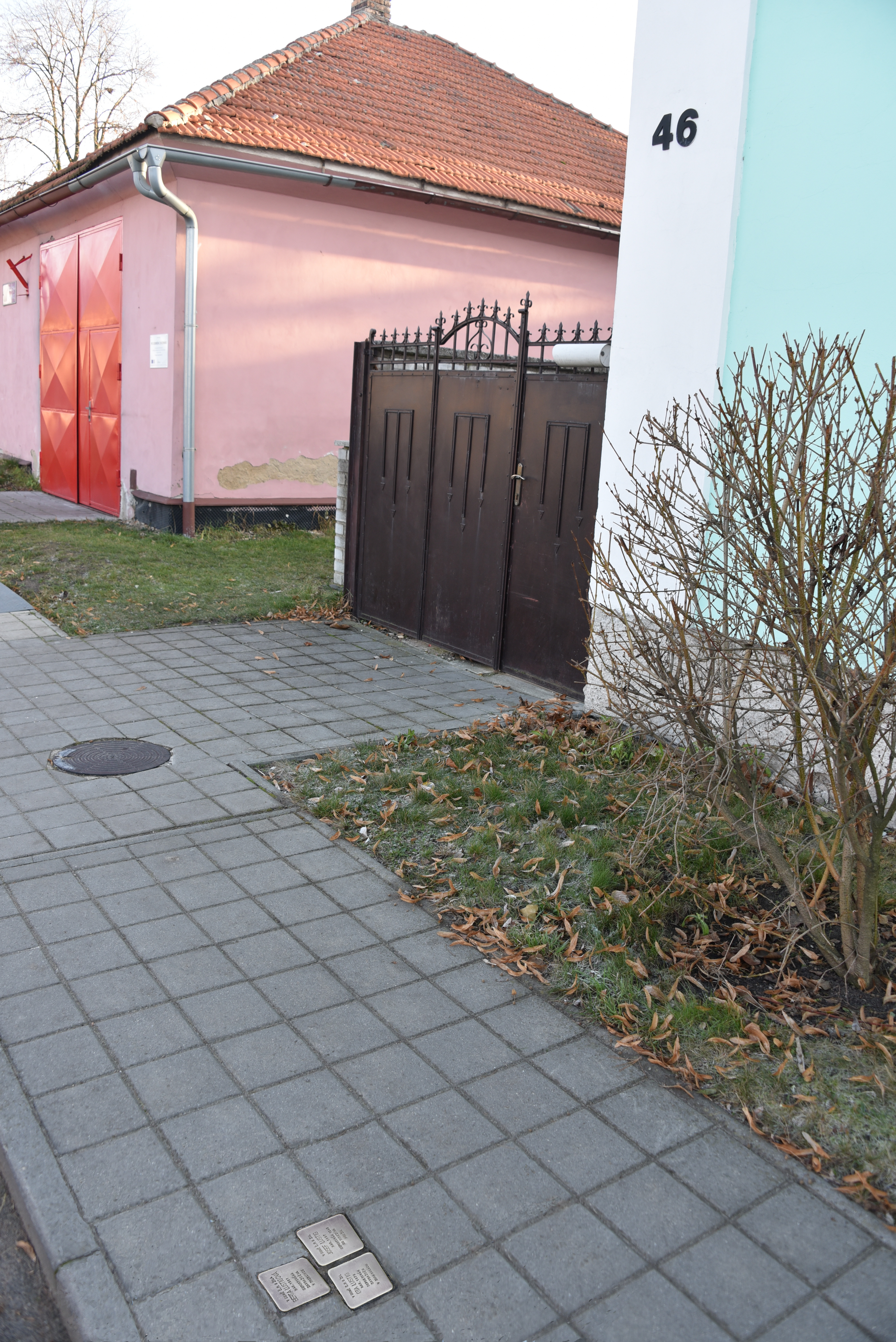
Three Stolpersteine in Ratenice in front of the building, where family Lustig lived

This article lists the Stolpersteine in Ratenice in the Central Bohemian Region (Czech: Středočeský kraj), the central part of Bohemia. Stolpersteine is the German name for stumbling blocks collocated all over Europe by German artist Gunter Demnig. They remember the fate of the Nazi victims being murdered, deported, exiled or driven to suicide.

Generally, the stumbling blocks are posed in front of the building where the victims had their last self chosen residence. The name of the Stolpersteine in Czech is: Kameny zmizelých, stones of the disappeared.

The lists are sortable; the basic order follows the alphabet according to the last name of the victim.

== Ratenice ==
Stone	Inscription	Location	Life and death
	HERE LIVED IN HOUSE No. 9 JOSEF LUSTIG; BORN 1887; DEPORTED 1945; TO THERESIENSTADT; SURVIVED	Ratenice 9; 50°05′21″N 15°03′42″E	Josef Lustig was born in 1887. He was the son of Berta Lustigová and he had an older brother named Ota. He was deported to Theresienstadt concentration camp in February 1945. There he became seriously ill. Although he survived the liberation and could return home, he still died in the course of 1945. Both mother and brother were murdered in the course of the Shoah.
	HERE LIVED IN HOUSE No. 9 OTA LUSTIG; BORN 1879; DEPORTED; MURDERED; IN TRAWNIKI	Ratenice 9; 50°05′21″N 15°03′42″E	Ota Lustig was born on 24 October 1879. His mother was Berta Lustigová, his younger brother was Josef Lustig.. On 9 June 1942, together with his mother, he was deported with transport AAc from Kolín to Theresienstadt concentration camp. His transport number was 300 of 725. On 12 June 1942 we was deported with transport AAk to Trawniki. His transport number was 886. All 1,027 Jews of this transport were murdered by the Nazi regime. Both mother and brother were murdered in the course of the Shoah.
	HERE LIVED IN HOUSE No. 9 BERTA LUSTIGOVÁ; BORN 1861; DEPORTED; MURDERED; IN TREBLINKA	Ratenice 9; 50°05′21″N 15°03′42″E	Berta Lustigová was born on 25 September 1861. She had at least two sons, Ota, born in 1879, and Josef, born in 1887. Her last residence before deportation was in Ratenice. On 9 June 1942, together with her son Ota, she was deported with transport AAc from Kolín to Theresienstadt concentration camp. Her transport number was 299 of 725. On 22 October 1942 she was deported with transport AAk to Treblinka extermination camp. Her transport number was 1039 of 2008. All Jews of this transport were murdered by the Nazi regime. Son Ota was deported to Trawniki in June 1942 and was killed there. Son Josef was deported to Theresienstadt in February 1945, became very sick, survived the liberation but still died in 1945.

== Collocation date ==
The Stolpersteine of Ratenice were collocated by the artist himself on 29 October 2012.

The Czech Stolperstein project was initiated in 2008 by the Česká unie židovské mládeže (Czech Union of Jewish Youth) and was realized with the patronage of the Mayor of Prague.

== See also ==
- List of places with Stolpersteine
- Stolpersteine in the Czech Republic
