= Les trois souhaits =

Opera by Bohuslav Martinů

Les trois souhaits, ou Les vicissitudes de la vie, H. 175, The three wishes, or life's tribulations, Czech Tři přání, is a film opera by Czech composer Bohuslav Martinů to a libretto by Georges Ribemont-Dessaignes. Composed mainly in Paris between autumn 1928 and May 1929, it was not premiered until June 1971 at the State Theatre, Brno. Grove describes the work as "one of the composer's most experimental works, blending film with stage action", and as "a mature drama" it is "comparable in theatrical impact to many of Martinů's later operas."

== Background ==
As an artist, poet and playwright Ribemont-Dessaignes was part of the Surrealist movement in Paris. As a composer, some of his piano works, written using a roulette wheel, had been heard at a Dadaist performance in the Salle Gaveau. Composer and librettist met when Ribemont-Dessaignes's work had just been translated into Czech. Ribemont-Dessaignes wrote the libretto for Martinů's second opera Les larmes du couteau (1928) with an "outlandish" and "jazz-oriented scenario".

The opera concerns not only the making of a film but incorporates the final result, with the worlds colliding in the film that we see being made, and the lines between reality and unreality (film) are frequently obscure. The work anticipates the later masterpiece Julietta, in the way it looks forward to the 'opera of dreams', with several references to dreams in the libretto. The opera is a play within a play, rather a film narrative within an episode of real-life. The composer planned a further collaboration with this poet, but it was never completed.

Ribemont-Dessaignes is quoted as saying that there is a 'vital intensity' in Martinů's music, which reflects, and is perfectly in harmony with, the action. Very much of its time, the score references "the wit of Les Six, La Revue nègre and the first tangos in Paris... snatches of atonality", while "quirky, wistful music, calling for a jazz pianist and a barbershop quartet, puts on a smile in the face of life’s bitterness". The score calls for a banjo, saxophone, flexatone as well as an accordion, the latter also used in Julietta. An orchestral entr'acte before the final scene, entitled Le Départ exists as an independent orchestral work."

== Performance history ==
Despite the rejection of their first opera Les larmes du couteau by the Baden-Baden Festival Martinů and Ribemont-Dessaignes began immediately a collaboration on another opera, which was completed soon after in May 1929. Les trois souhaits aroused some interest in 1930 from the directors of the Berlin-Charlottenburg Opera; Martinů travelled to the German capital to present the work, but negotiations foundered on financial and administrative considerations to do with making the film and the sets, significantly greater than what they were used to create. The opera received its posthumous premiere on 16 June 1971 in the Janáček Opera House Brno in a production by the film director Evald Schorm; the conductor was Václav Nosek. Photography was by Jaroslav Kučera.

In May 1973, conducted by Jean-Pierre Jacquillat, a production by the then joint directors of the Lyon Opera, Louis Erlo and Jean Aster, was seen by the composer's widow, the cast including Emmy Gregor as the fairy. A further production was mounted in Lyon in October 1990, conducted by Kent Nagano in a production by Louis Erlo and Alain Maratrat; with a cast including Gilles Cachemaille, Jocelyne Taillon, Jules Bastin and Béatrice Uria-Monzon, it was subsequently issued on video.

The opera was produced at the National Theatre in Prague in 1990, with Jan Štych conducting, and again in December 2015 by the Ostrava National Moravian-Silesian Theatre under Jakub Klecker.

A production of January 2007 at the Großes Haus, Das Volkstheater Rostock, Germany conducted by Peter Leonard, directed by Jiří Nekvasil, and with Olaf Lemme (Juste/Arthur), Ines Wilhelm (Indolenda), Christoph Kayser (Adolphe), Lucie Ceralová (Fairy/Lilian Nevermore) was the first with no musical cuts; some dialogue alone was excised at the start of Act 3.

== Roles ==
Role (role in film)	Voice type	Premiere Cast, 16 June 1971 (Conductor: Václav Nosek)
Artur de St. Barbe (Mr. Juste)	baritone	Jaroslav Souček
Nina Valencia (Indolenda)	mezzo-soprano	Milada Šafránková
Serge Eliacin (Adolf)	tenor	Josef Škrobánek
Lilian Nevermore (Fairy)	mezzo-soprano	Eva Výmolová
Eblouie Barbichette (Žebračka)	soprano	Jarmila Krátká
Adelaida, Nina's maid (Barmanka)	mezzo-soprano	Libuše Lesmanová
Director	spoken	Jiří Přichystal
Kapitán	bass	Václav Halíř
Majordomo	tenor	Zdeněk Soušek
Generál	baritone	Jaroslav Ulrych
Minister of finance	baritone	František Kunc
Dinah	soprano	Jaroslava Janská
Argentinian singer	tenor	Zdeněk Pospíšilík
Barman	tenor	Jiří Holešovský
Námořní hlídka / Telefonista / Waiter	spoken	Pavel Stejskal
Two ladies and an gentleman		Mahulena Motlová, Míla Lubichová, Jiří Bakala
Clowns	(dancers)	Juraj Dubovec, Emanuel Fišer, Arnošt Stejskal
Chorus

== Synopsis ==
=== Prologue ===
A chorus singing about money – with a refrain “a thousand dollars” is cut off by the entrance of the director and crew for a film who began the frantic preparations for the shoot. While the director organizes the filming there is an urgent call for missing props and dresses. The main characters enter from their dressing rooms: Nina Valencia (playing Indolenda) and her husband Arthur de St. Barbe (Mr. Juste), Serge Eliacin (Adolf) and Lillian Nevermore (the Fairy). After a brief flirtation between Serge and Nina, the filming begins, and the story of the film and opera.

=== Act 1 ===
The first two acts take place on a film set where the film of the story of the three wishes (for wealth, youth and love) is being made. The sound of a cuckoo clock in the Justes’ bedroom heralds morning. Their marriage has clearly run out of steam, and he goes out hunting in the forest, which has become the substitute for his former sex-life. His wife tries to hold on to the memory of her last night dream involving “Three stars in a single trap! A rose without thorns! A golden-blue flower? A black lily of snow!”, the same dream elements having been experienced by Adelaide, the couple’s servant. In the forest, Juste comes upon a fairy caught in a trap, releases her and brings her home. Indolenda, bored, flirts with Adolf, her younger cousin, who shows little interest in his older relative. When Juste brings the fairy home, she removes any suspicion that she might be a new mistress by promising to make three wishes come true if she would regain her liberty. Indolenda makes the first wish, to be rich. The Juste home immediately fills with objects of wealth and they change into glamorous clothes! Posh guests enter delighting in the riches. The Fairy meanwhile unveils a secret: this is an engagement party for Adolf and the wealthy Eblouie Barbichette. For a wedding gift, the Fairy offers them a golden island with a gilded palace. With the chorus intoning “Life is beautiful!” the act ends.

=== Act 2 ===
The act begins on a sea voyage to the island as Juste and Indolenda demand proof that the golden island is real. The proof soon arrives in the form of golden birds flying above, golden fish swimming in the sea, and eventually, all is gilded, including the passengers, until the boat, weighed down by the gold, sinks. Stranded on the island Juste makes a wish for his wife to become young, and this happens; but Indolenda does not desire Juste, opting for her cousin Adolf as a willing lover. From the desert island, the scene changes to a small square where Juste sadly sounds his hunting horn. Indolenda and Adolf appear on a balcony on the square swearing their love and dance a tango to a gramophone record. Juste is saved from his rejection by the fairy who reminds him of the remaining wish: Juste wishes to be loved. A hunchbacked vagrant (the formerly rich Eblouie Barbichette) falls in love with him but becomes so possessive that finally she beats out of jealousy. The expiring Juste murmurs how hard his life is as a cuckoo cry (of the fairy) marks his end. The director calls 'cut' and there is elation all round as the director invites the actors to a party. Indolenda and Adolf (as the actors Nina Valencia and Serge Eliacin) decide that they will continue to be lovers in real life as well.

=== Act 3 ===
The third act is the film itself as shot in the first two acts and an epilogue. It starts with a crowd outside the cinema of the premiere. The film about the start is the full story repeated (through and instrumental movement of around fifteen minutes) and is a major success. Nina is still decided on leaving her husband (Artur) so as to go off with Serge. After Le Départ, in an epilogue, Artur enters a bar, remaining apart, proud of his success, but fearing that the others present are mocking him. Finally, alone in the empty bar, he ends with the exact from his role in the film role, “Life is so hard!”, but there is no film director to say 'cut'.
