= Sęk =

Sęk is a Polish surname. It is a cognate of the Czech and Ukrainian surname Suk. Notable people with the surname include:

- Dariusz Sęk (born 1986), Polish boxer
- Paweł Sęk (born 1977), Polish composer and audio engineer
- Szymon Szynkowski vel Sęk (born 1982), Polish politician
