= Sokoleč =

- Municipality
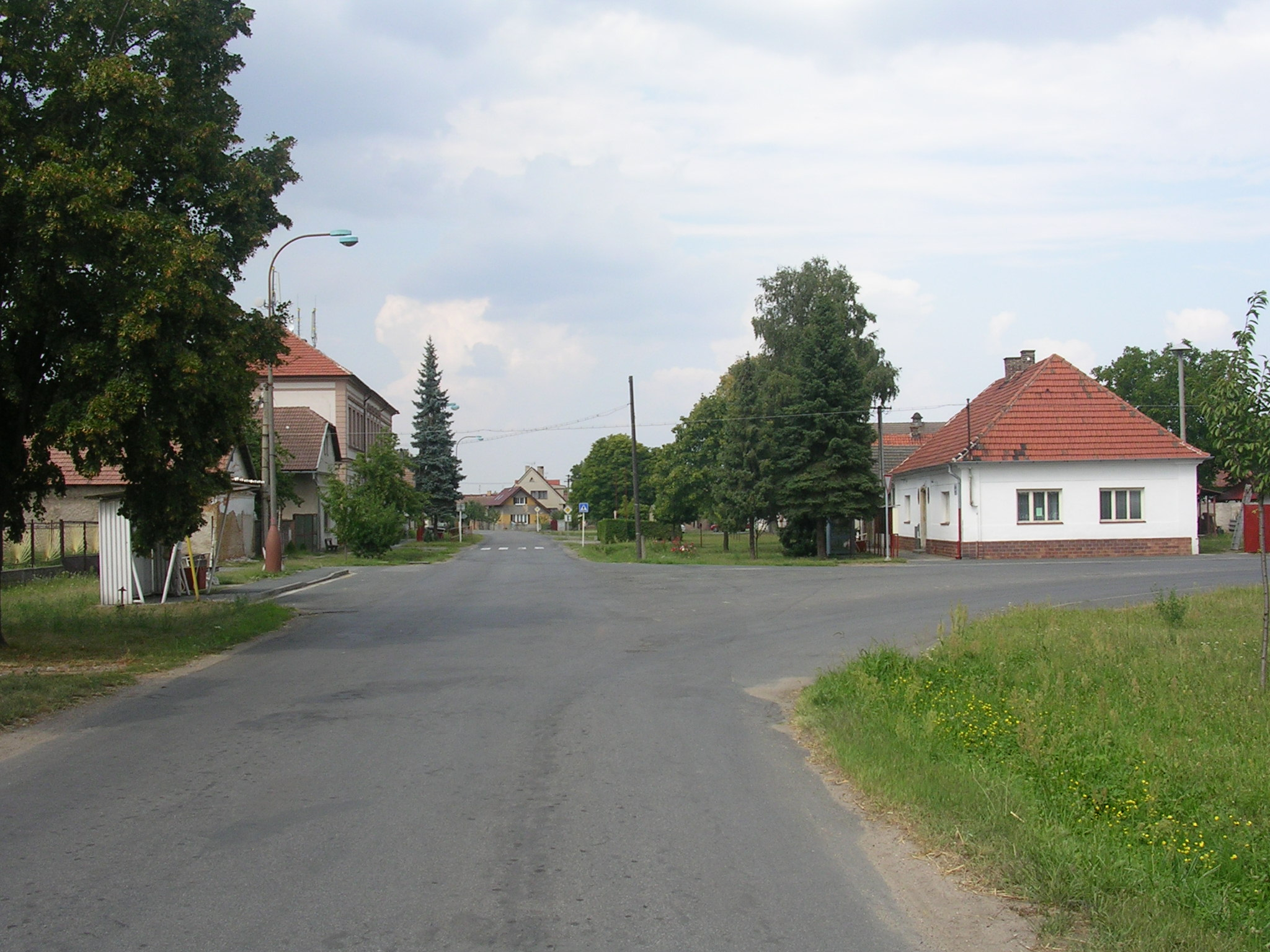
- Main road in Sokoleč

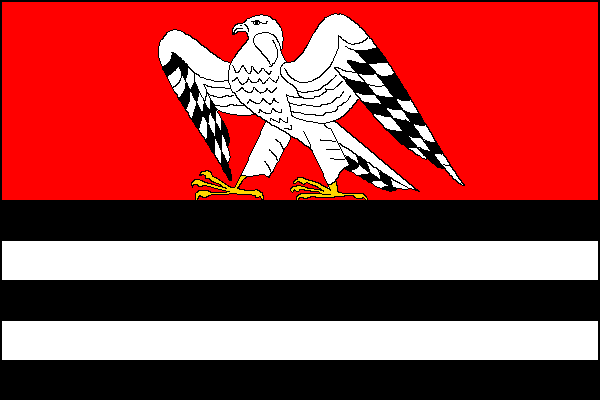
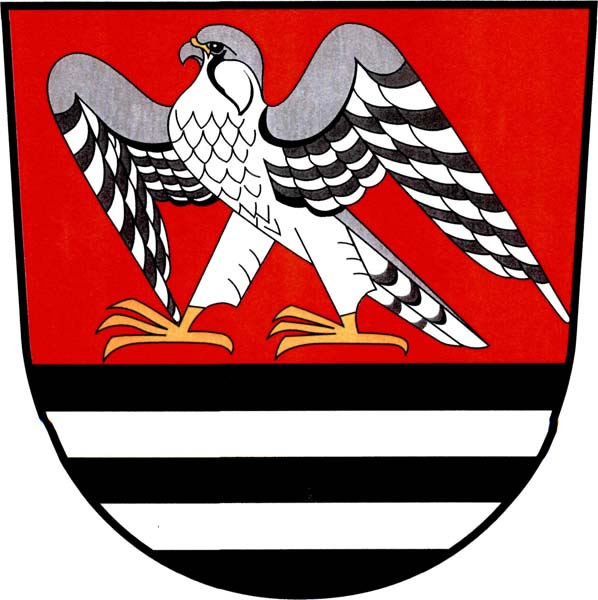
- Flag Coat of arms

- Location in the Czech Republic
- Coordinates: 50°5′55″N 15°6′25″E
- Country: Czech Republic
- Region: Central Bohemian
- District: Nymburk
- First mentioned: 1332

Area
  - Total: 6.28 km^{2} (2.42 sq mi)
- Elevation: 192 m (630 ft)

Population (2026-01-01)
  - Total: 1,121
  - Density: 179/km^{2} (462/sq mi)
- Time zone: UTC+1 (CET)
  - Summer (DST): UTC+2 (CEST)
- Postal code: 290 01
- Website: www.sokolec.cz

Sokoleč is a municipality and village in Nymburk District in the Central Bohemian Region of the Czech Republic. It has about 1,100 inhabitants.

== Etymology ==
The initial name of the village was Sokolčí. The name was derived from the word sokolník, i.e. 'falconer'.

== Geography ==
Sokoleč is located about 11 kilometres (7 mi) south of Nymburk and 40 km (25 mi) east of Prague. It lies in a flat landscape of the Central Elbe Table.

== History ==
The first written mention of Sokoleč is from 1332.

== Demographics ==
Historical population

| Year | Pop. | ±% |
|---|---|---|
| 1869 | 576 | — |
| 1880 | 703 | +22.0% |
| 1890 | 780 | +11.0% |
| 1900 | 848 | +8.7% |
| 1910 | 951 | +12.1% |

| Year | Pop. | ±% |
|---|---|---|
| 1921 | 929 | −2.3% |
| 1930 | 897 | −3.4% |
| 1950 | 883 | −1.6% |
| 1961 | 931 | +5.4% |
| 1970 | 855 | −8.2% |

| Year | Pop. | ±% |
|---|---|---|
| 1980 | 860 | +0.6% |
| 1991 | 815 | −5.2% |
| 2001 | 795 | −2.5% |
| 2011 | 908 | +14.2% |
| 2021 | 1,088 | +19.8% |

Source: Censuses

== Transport ==
There are no railways or major roads passing through the municipality. The village lies entirely within the Velim railway test circuit.

== Sights ==
There are no protected cultural monuments in the municipality.
