= Velim test centre =

Railway testing facility in the Czech Republic

Coordinates: 50°06′00″N 15°05′45″E

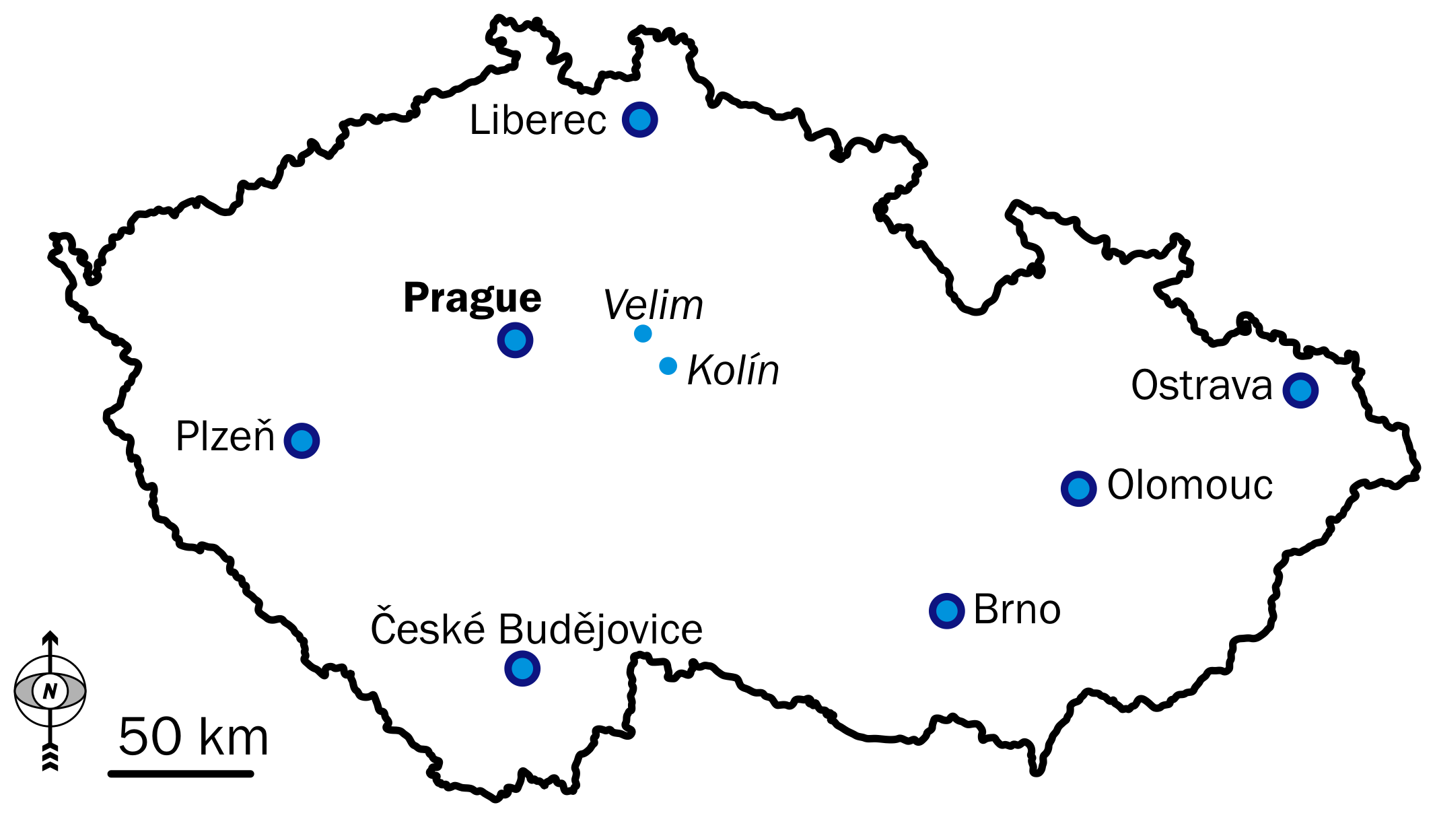
Location of Velim in the Czech Republic

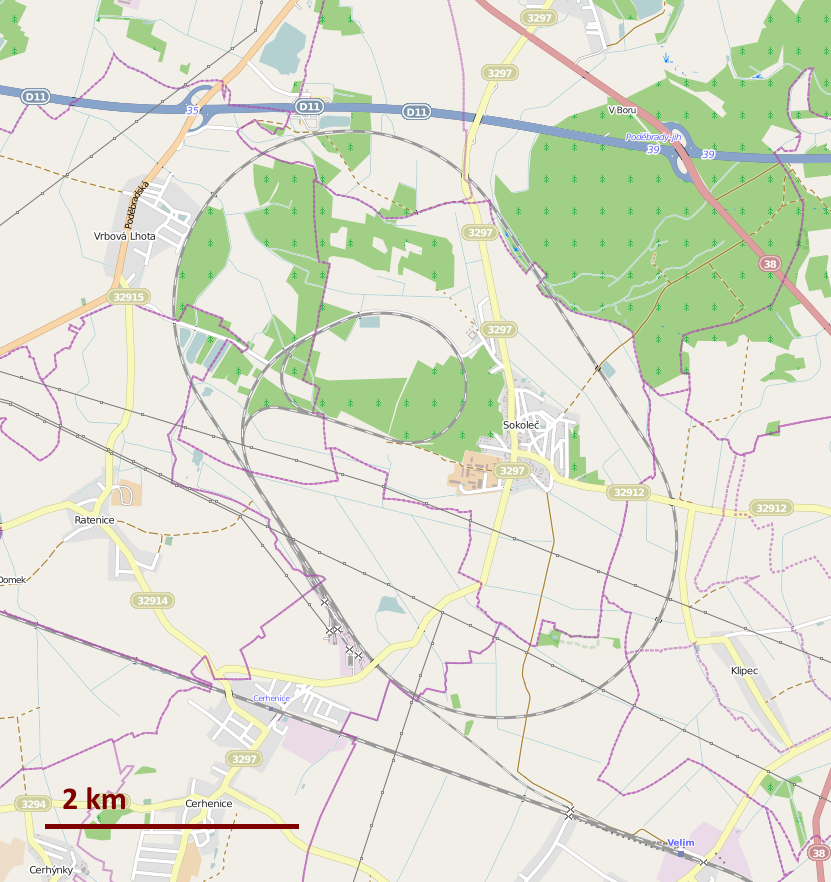
Overview map of the test circuit

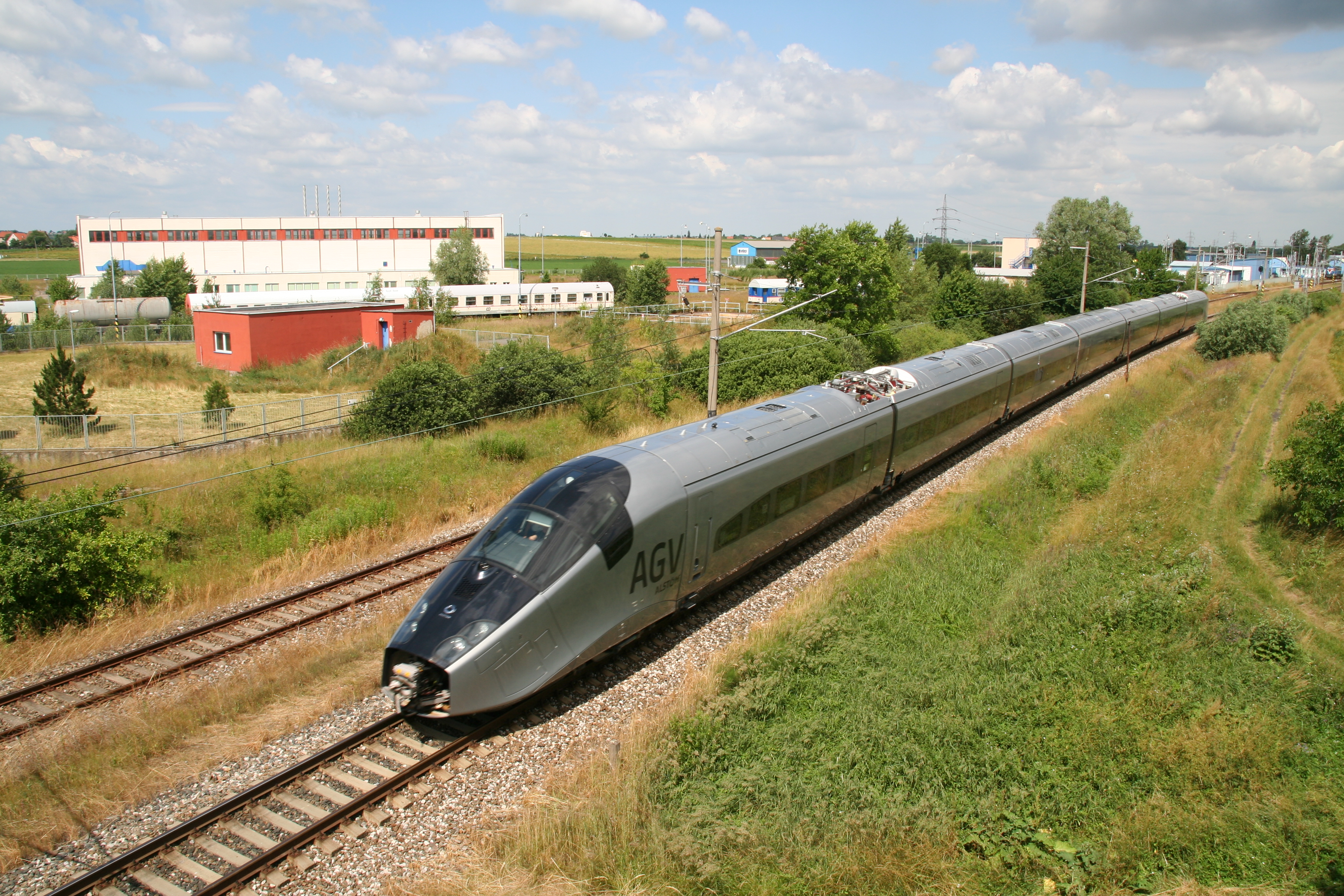
Alstom AGV train running at 200 km/h on the large circuit

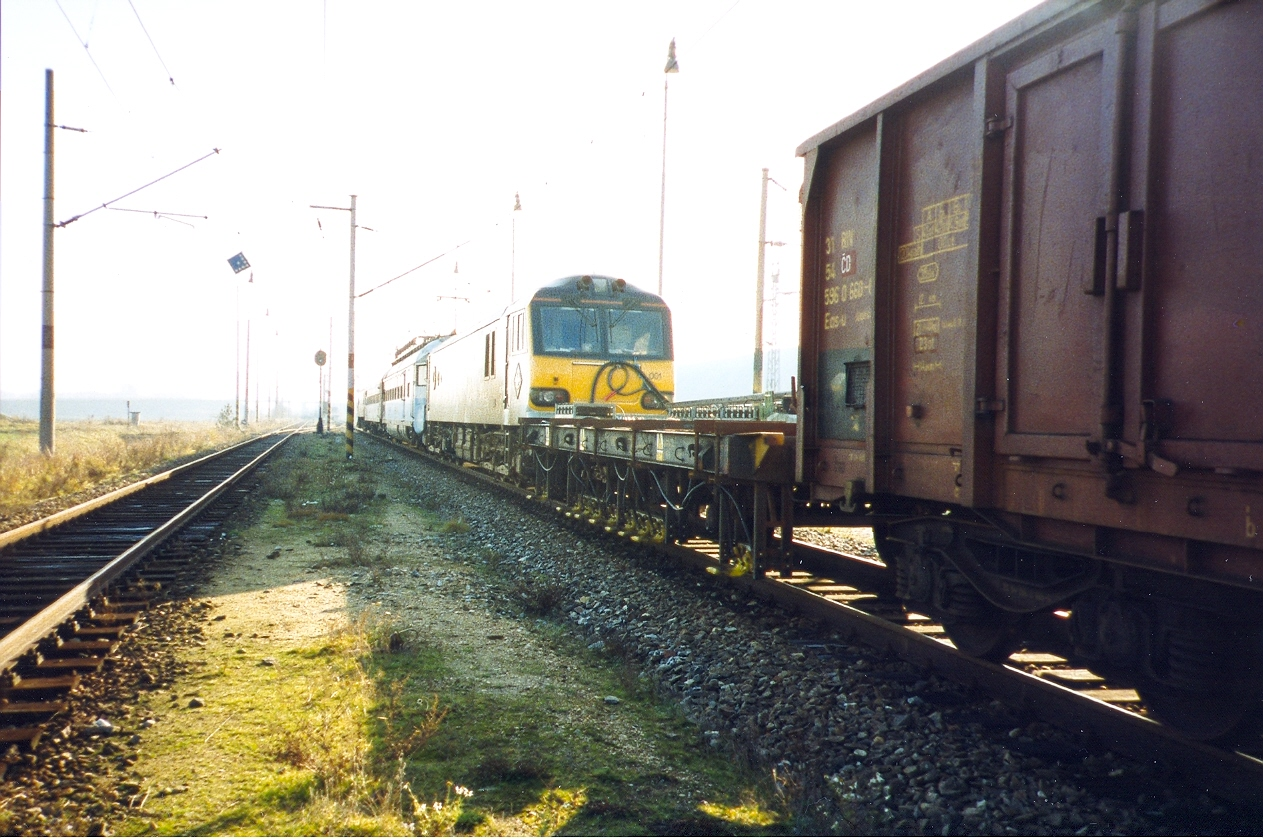
British Class 92 92001 cross-channel dual-voltage locomotive under test in November 1994

The Velim test centre (Czech: Zkušební centrum Velim) is a railway rolling stock testing facility at Cerhenice, close to the town of Kolín in the Central Bohemian Region of the Czech Republic. Perhaps its most notable feature is the Cerhenice railway test circuit, which consists of two large standard gauge railway track ovals, designed to allow the continuous running of rail vehicles for evaluation and testing.

The Velim test centre was constructed during the 1960s and was largely used for domestic purposes early on. During the 1990s, it became increasing popular with international customers, which drove demands to recondition the centre's facilities to fulfill the latest standards of the rail industry. Between 2005 and 2014, an extensive modernisation programme was undertaken at Velim; this involved most aspects of its operations, including power supplies, signalling, overhead electrification, preparation halls, and track. The Velim test centre is presently owned by the Railway Research Institute (VUZ, Výzkumný ústav železniční), a wholly owned subsidiary of the national railway operator, České dráhy. It has become one of the main testing locations for new types of rolling stock designed for use in Europe, and has been a fully accredited European test centre since March 1995.

== Facilities ==
=== Test circuit ===
Both of the standard gauge test circuits were purpose-built for the facility during 1963, and are located between the villages of Vrbová Lhota, Ratenice, Cerhenice, Velim, Pňov-Předhradí and the southern suburbs of Poděbrady. The village of Sokoleč lies completely inside the larger circuit.

- small circuit 3.951-kilometre long with a maximum allowed speed of 115 km/h.
- large circuit 13.276-kilometre long with a maximum allowed speed of 230 km/h for tilting trains and up to 210 km/h for conventional trains.

These circuits allow for the testing of the characteristics of vehicles, noise levels, the ability to communicate using the European Train Control System (ETCS) and GSM-R radio, and simulation of failures and changes in power system.

Both circuits provide all railway electrification systems used in central Europe:

- 3000 V (DC)
- 1500 V (DC)
- 25 kV AC railway electrification (50 Hz)
- 15 kV AC railway electrification (16.7 Hz)

In addition, a 1.5-kilometre length can be equipped with third rail supply for metro operators.

Beyond the tracks themselves, a total of four preparation halls are present on site.

=== Modernisation ===
Much of the site's infrastructure has been progressively replaced during the 21st century due to numerous elements such as the power supplies, catenary and even the track itself no longer satisfying some customers' requirements. The condition of some equipment had been diminished by past decisions to conduct only minimal maintenance on order to save money. Competition from rival test sites, such as Poland's Żmigród Centre and Germany's Wegberg-Wildenrath Test and Validation Centre, has also motivated planners to undertake extensive reconstruction work so that the site's facilities fully conform with modern standards, in part supported by funding provided by the European Union. The tracks were replaced during the 1990s, but a greater scope of work was required to properly address modern needs.

In 2005, the three-phase Test Centre Modernisation Project was launched with the goal of becoming the first facility in Europe to be approved for testing lineside ETCS equipment. Initial activities were concentrated on the site's power supplies, a new substation was constructed, improved power regulation implemented, and accommodations for increased DC output from the traction were also provided, along with energy recovery systems being installed. The overhead electrification and superstructure on the outer circuit was addressed during the second phase of work; an additional preparation hall was also constructed along with the refurbishment of the two existing ones. The third phase, which started during 2012, involved the installation of ETCS (levels 1 and 2) equipment on the outer test track, and the extension of the second preparation hall.

During 2019, it was announced that a major investment in Velim was to take place as to facilitate the future testing of autonomous commuter trains. Other infrastructure would also be constructed onsite which is aimed at improving the test centre's environmental footprint and reduce carbon emissions; a new plant will be established to produce green hydrogen to fuel hydrail rolling stock.

== Notable activities ==
Upon first becoming operational in 1963, the Velim test centre was historically primarily used to support the activities of Czechoslovakia's national rail operator, the Czechoslovak State Railways, as well as domestic manufacturing companies active in the field, such as CKD and Škoda. Since the end of the Cold War and the Dissolution of Czechoslovakia, activities at Velim have taken on an increasingly international focus. It has become particularly commonplace for numerous train construction companies across Europe opting to send their rolling stock there to undergo intensive testing to satisfy increasingly vigorous certification requirements. To this end, Velim became a fully accredited European test centre in March 1995, and became a notified body for carrying out vehicle and equipment authorisations in accordance with the Technical Specifications for Interoperability.

During 2008 and 2009, the French rolling stock manufacturer Alstom tested its new Automotrice à grande vitesse (AGV) high speed train at Velim; coincidentally, the V250 high speed train produced by the Italian train builder AnsaldoBreda was also being tested around the same time frame. The IC4, which is another train built by AnsaldoBreda, underwent multiple rounds of tests at Velim, in part due to the bureaucratic procedure to approve a new system version for test on a Danish mainline railway. Alstom had regularly dispatched rolling stock from several different families, including the ICNG and the Coradia, for testing at Velim ahead of delivery to customers. In addition to these international customers, rolling stock from local producer Škoda has continued to be tested at the facility as well.

By the 21st century, it became commonplace amongst rolling stock manufacturers that were engaged in supplying the British railway sector to have their products undergo dynamic testing at Velim; examples include the Class 196, Class 701, and Class 802 multiple units, and the Class 88 bi-mode locomotive. Unpowered rolling stock, such as the British Rail Mark 5A coach, have also evaluated been at the site.
