= Flavio Cattaneo =

Italian businessman

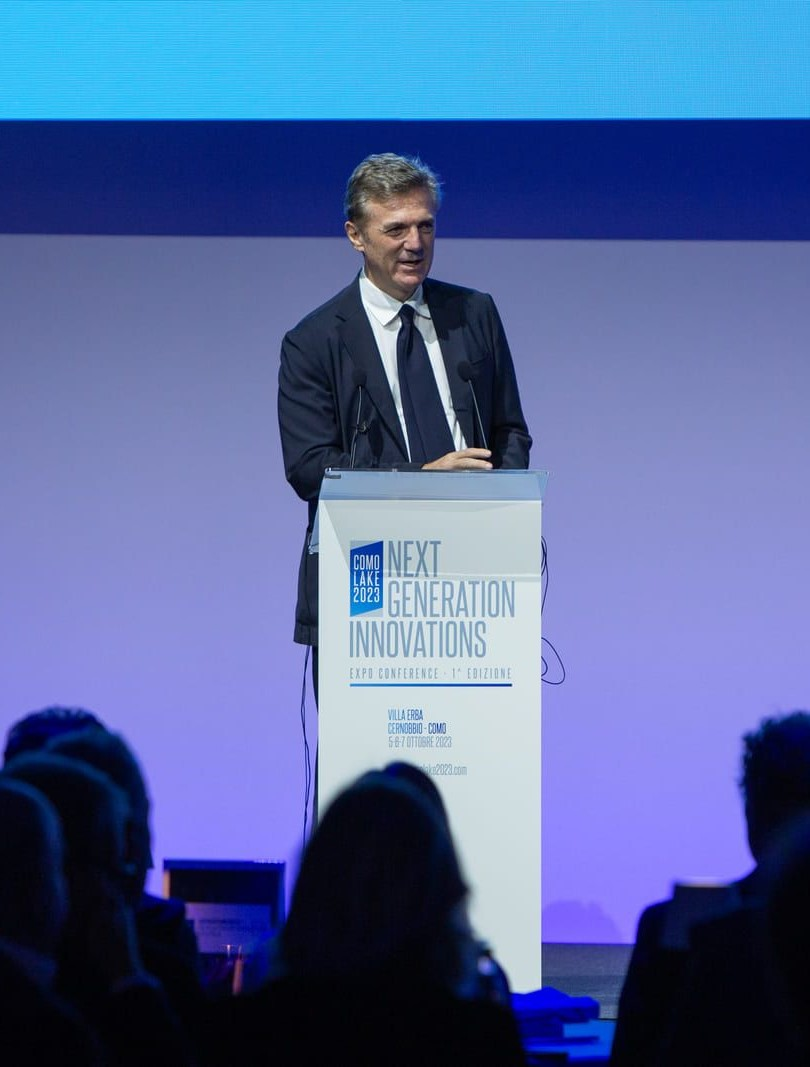
- Born: 27 June 1963 (age 63); Rho, Italy
- Citizenship: Italian
- Education: Polytechnic University of Milan, Master in Architecture
- Occupation: Businessman
- Title: CEO, Enel
- Term: 12 May 2023–present
- Predecessor: Francesco Starace
- Spouse: Sabrina Ferilli (m. 2011)
- Website: https://www.enel.com/investors/governance/board-of-directors/flavio-cattaneo

Flavio Cattaneo (born 27 June 1963) is an Italian manager and entrepreneur. Since 2023, he has been CEO and General Manager of Enel and vice chair of Endesa. He is also a member of the Board of Directors of Assicurazioni Generali.

== Career ==
=== Education, early career and professional experience at Rai ===
A graduate in architecture from the Polytechnic University of Milan, Cattaneo received a specialisation in business finance and management in the real estate sector at SDA Bocconi School of Management. From 1989 to 1998 he served as CEO of various Italian companies in the building and real estate sectors. From 1998 to 2001, Cattaneo was director of several energy companies, including AEM S.p.A. (now A2A) as deputy chairman, in which he was in charge of the gas distribution activities in the northeast of Italy as CEO of Triveneta Gas S.p.A. and Seneca Gas S.p.A. From 1999 to 2003, he was chairman and CEO of Fiera Milano S.p.A., the leading exhibition group in Italy, of which he oversaw its stock listing in 2001. Before the IPO, he followed the spin-off between the institutional activities of the foundation and the market activities in charge of the S.p.A., which expanded internationally with an increase of its international presence in over 30 countries.

From 2003 to 2005 Cattaneo was nominated general director of Rai. He was the youngest managing director of RAI S.p.A., the Italian public service broadcaster. The next year, under his leadership, the company gained its highest revenue ever.

=== Positions at Terna, Nuovo Trasporto Viaggiatori (NTV), Telecom Italia, Italo, and Itabus ===
From 2005 to 2014, Cattaneo was CEO of the infrastructure company Terna S.p.A., the Italian electricity transmission grid operator and the leading independent grid operator in Europe. During his management tenure, he developed an international expansion strategy in South America and in the Balkans, doubling the value of the stock price, and leading to the company recognized internationally as the best utility stock in Europe for total shareholder return (Edison Electric International Award Washington D.C., periods from 2007 to 2009 and from 2010 to 2012).

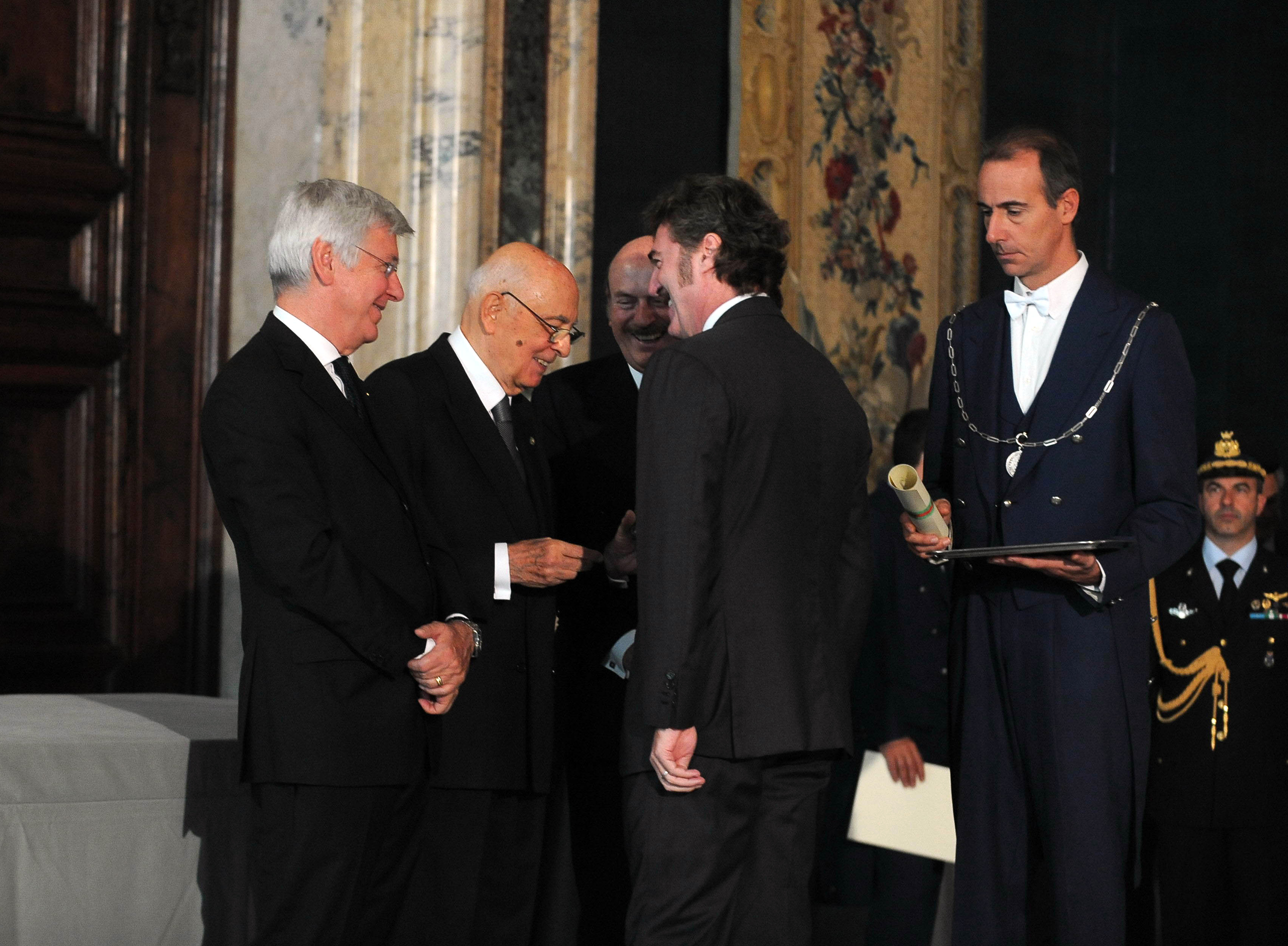
Flavio Cattaneo was awarded the title of Knight of Labour in 2011.

From 2007 to 2011, Cattaneo was also chairman of the Brazilian subsidiary TERNA Partecipaçoes, a private electricity grid operator. During that period, the subsidiary was listed on the BOVESPA Stock Exchange and became the first private grid operator in Brazil.

In his role as CEO of Terna, in 2010, Flavio Cattaneo was named the best Italian manager and ranked fifth overall in the energy sector among more than 40 European executives.

He also served on the board of directors of several companies: Generali Assicurazioni (independent director, from December 2014 to April 2016); Domus Italia (chairman, from March 2015 to May 2016); and Cementir Holding S.p.A. (independent director and member of the Nomination and Remuneration Committee and Control and Risks Committee, from January 2008 to April 2015).

From February 2015 to April 2016, Cattaneo was CEO of NTV S.p.A. the first Italian private railway operator in the high-speed railway market (over 90% of sales made via web site CRM). During his time as CEO, NTV achieved positive net income for the first time since inception.

From March 2016 to July 2017 Cattaneo held the title of CEO of Telecom Italia, replacing the resigning Marco Patuano. While he was CEO, Telecom Italia experienced improved growth and efficiency, including completing a major and extraordinary turnaround of the business via a major reorganization of internal processes, efficiency plans on non-core costs, and revenue plans. This resulted in the company increasing its customer and revenue numbers to levels not reached in the last 10 years, increasing its core investments, bringing the company back to leading the mobile segment in downloads, and covering around 70% of the country with fibre. Before his appointment as CEO, he was already on the board of directors as an independent director since April 2014; he also served as member of the Nomination and Remuneration Committee until March 2015.

Cattaneo's responsibilities at Telecom Italia were related to the overall management of the society and the group, being in charge of conceiving and implementing strategic, financial, and industrial plans. He also had organizational responsibilities, in charge of managing and developing Italian and South American business.

During Cattaneo's tenure, the development of the 2016-2018 business plan included the growth and improved efficiency of the group. The results of this plan were visible in the second and third quarters of 2016, when Telecom Italia registered results in the domestic market not equalled since 2007: +1,4% of consolidated returns, +8,5% of the group's Ebitda, +1% of domestic business unit revenue, and an overall return of €1 billion (vs €367 million gained in the same period of 2015).

Cattaneo returned to Italo-Nuovo Trasporto Viaggiatori as CEO, from September 2017 to December 2018. In February 2018, Cattaneo finalized the sale of Italo to GIP – Global Infrastructure Partners (an American fund that focuses its investments on three main sectors: energy, transportation and water/waste) for an enterprise value of €2.4 billion, reinvesting in the company, and remaining a shareholder. From December 2018, Cattaneo has served as executive deputy chairman of Italo - Nuovo Trasporto Viaggiatori.

On 27 April 2021, Itabus was launched, a private long-distance bus transport company of which Flavio Cattaneo is founder and majority shareholder. Among the key figures involved in the initiative are Luca Cordero di Montezemolo, Giovanni and Lucio Punzo, Angelo Donati, and Isabella Seragnoli. Flavio Cattaneo established Itabus through Essecieffe Investment, a company he founded in 2014 to focus on entrepreneurial ventures, and which was already a shareholder in Italo.

Since 29 April 2022, he has once again served as a board member of Assicurazioni Generali, having previously held the same role from 2014 to 2016.

=== Professional roles at Enel and Endesa ===
In May 2023, he was appointed CEO and General Manager of Enel. In June 2023, he was also appointed Vice Chair of Endesa.

In spring 2023, Italo acquired 100% of Itabus. Flavio Cattaneo remained a shareholder and Vice President of the company, while stepping down from all executive responsibilities. At the end of April 2024, following the completion of the acquisition of a majority stake in Italo by the MSC Group, Flavio Cattaneo sold his shares and stepped down from all previously held positions. In May 2024, he voluntarily declined his severance package from Enel, amounting to approximately €10 million, equivalent to 24 months of salary. In November 2024, he presented Enel's 2025-2027 Strategic Plan, which included investments totaling €43 billion. On 24 April 2025, he was reconfirmed as a member of the board of directors of Assicurazioni Generali.

== Awards and honors ==
=== National awards ===
- In 2011, he was awarded the title of Knight of Labour.
- In December 2011, he was named “Man of the Year” by Staffetta Quotidiana.
- In December 2016, he was voted “Manager of the Year” in a Milano-Finanza survey, in recognition of the industrial improvements achieved by the Telecom Italia Group, including increased revenues in both mobile and fixed-line services during the first nine months of the year.

=== International awards ===
- EEI International Utility Award for best-performing European utility based on stock performance for the period 2006–2009.
- EEI International Utility Award for best-performing European utility based on stock performance for the period 2010–2012.
- Lombard Elite Award, for contributions to improving Italy's competitiveness.
- Niaf Dea Roma Special Achievement Award in Management Leadership during the National Italian American Foundation (NIAF)’s 50th-anniversary celebrations held in Washington in October 2025.

== Criticism ==
Flavio Cattaneo earned a bonus of €25 million as CEO at Telecom Italia; this has been stated by some market economy analysts as an unfair bonus, because of the company's high debt load, estimated at €26 billion.

== Personal life ==
Cattaneo is married to the Italian actress Sabrina Ferilli.

== See also ==
- Enel
- Endesa
- Assicurazioni Generali
- Terna Group
- TIM Group
- Italo Nuovo Trasporto Viaggiatori
