= Italo Nuovo Trasporto Viaggiatori =

Italian private equity-owned rail operator

Italo S.p.A.
- Type: Joint-stock company
- Industry: Rail transport
- Founded: 11 December 2006
- Headquarters: Rome, Italy
- Key people: Luca Cordero di Montezemolo (founder and chairman); Gianbattista La Rocca (CEO)
- Products: Passenger transport
- Revenue: ▼€413.5 million (2020)
- Operating income: ▼€51.7 million (2020)
- Net income: ▼€31.9 million (2020)
- Total assets: ▲€3,243.9 million (2020)
- Number of employees: 1,369 (2020)
- Parent: Mediterranean Shipping Company
- Website: italospa.italotreno.it

Italo - Nuovo Trasporto Viaggiatori S.p.A. (Italian for 'New Travellers' Transport') is an Italian open-access train operating company operating in the field of high-speed rail transport under the brand name Italo (IPA: [ˈiːtalo]), stylized as .ıtalo.

Commencing services in early 2012, it became Europe's first private open access operator of 300 km/h (190 mph) high-speed trains. NTV was created in 2006 as a privately owned high-speed rail operator. In January 2008, the company ordered 25 Alstom Automotrice à grande vitesse (AGV) trainsets, which formed NTV's initial fleet. Despite intentions to begin services in late 2011, the launch of passenger operations was postponed to April 2012 due to lengthy certification processes. On 28 April 2012, NTV conducted its first service. In its first year of operation, 2 million passengers used NTV's trains. By 2016, annual ridership reached 11 million, taking market share from competing airlines and state-owned incumbent Trenitalia. Further trainsets of Alstom's Pendolino family have also been procured, as well as coordination with bus operators, as measures to expand NTV's service coverage.

The headquarters of NTV is located in Rome. Since October 2023, the company is jointly owned by the Mediterranean Shipping Company and the infrastructure equity investment fund Global Infrastructure Partners. As of 2024, the company covers routes to 54 cities within Italy.

== Corporate affairs ==
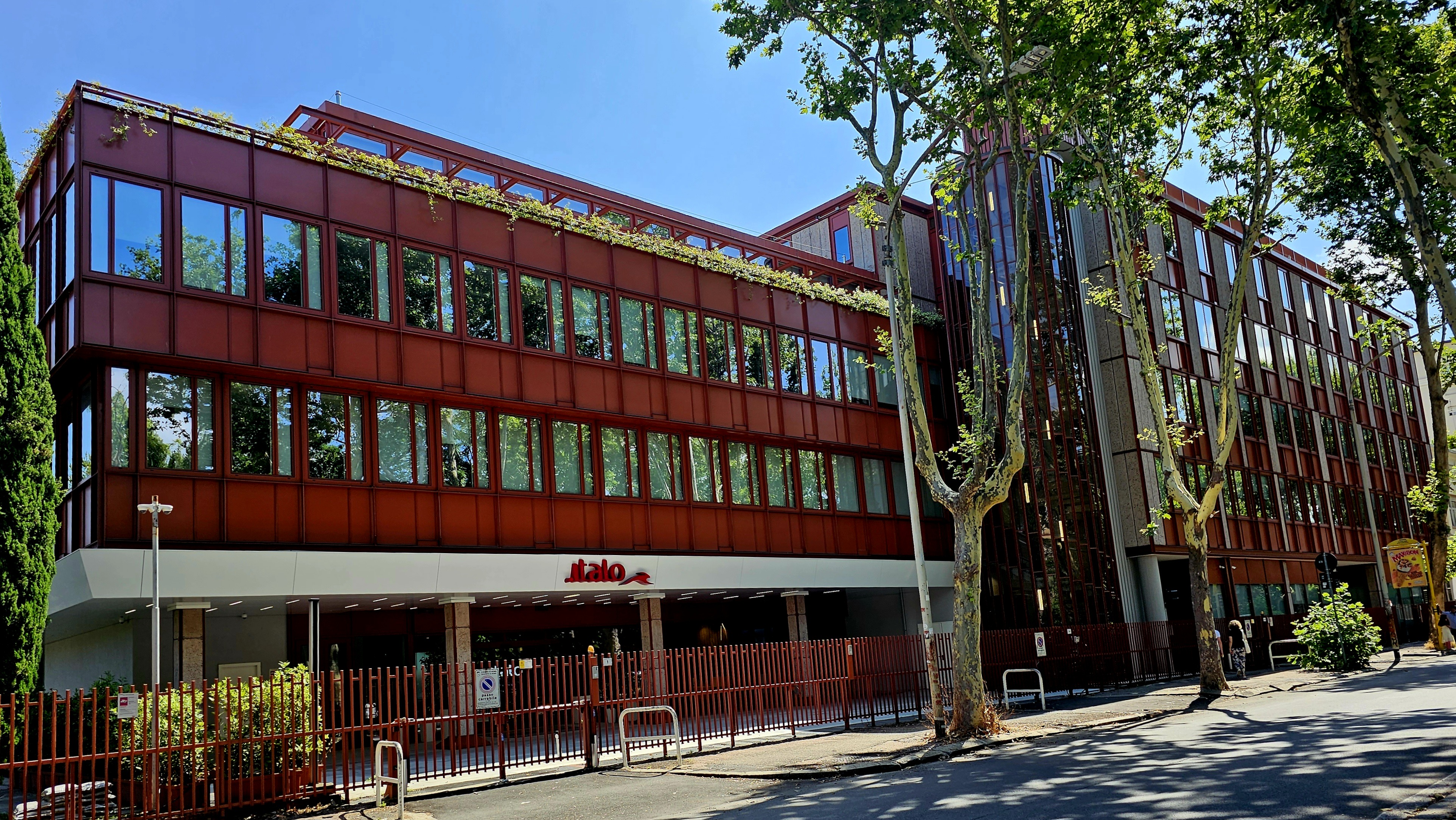
Italo headquarters in Rome

=== Ownership ===
The French railway operator SNCF owned 20% until 2015 when it refused to participate in a capital increase and preferred to liquidate its shareholding in 2015. In October 2023, Mediterranean Shipping Company (MSC) acquired a 50% stake in Italo. Before that, the shareholding structure was as follows:

- 72.6% GIP III GLOBAL INVESTMENT S.A.R.L.
- 11.5% Allianz S.P.A., of which 10% via ALLIANZ INFRASTRUCTURE LUXEMBOURG S.A.R.L.
- 7.7% REINVESTING SHAREHOLDERS (Luca Cordero di Montezemolo, Flavio Cattaneo, Giovanni Punzo, Isabella Seragnoli, Alberto Bombassei, Peninsula Capital)
- 7.6% IP INFRA INVESTORS LP
- 0.6% MOLAGERS

=== Activities ===
Italo logo

For the performance of its services, commercially promoted under the name Italo, NTV deploys the AGV 575, commissioned to Alstom in 2008, and the electric train NTV ETR 675, also committed to Alstom in 2015 and which from 7 December 2017 - following the change of the railway timetable - gradually enter in service. The Italo services travel both on dedicated high-speed lines and on conventional lines, and compete on the market with the Frecciarossa and Frecciargento trains of Trenitalia.

=== Service concept ===
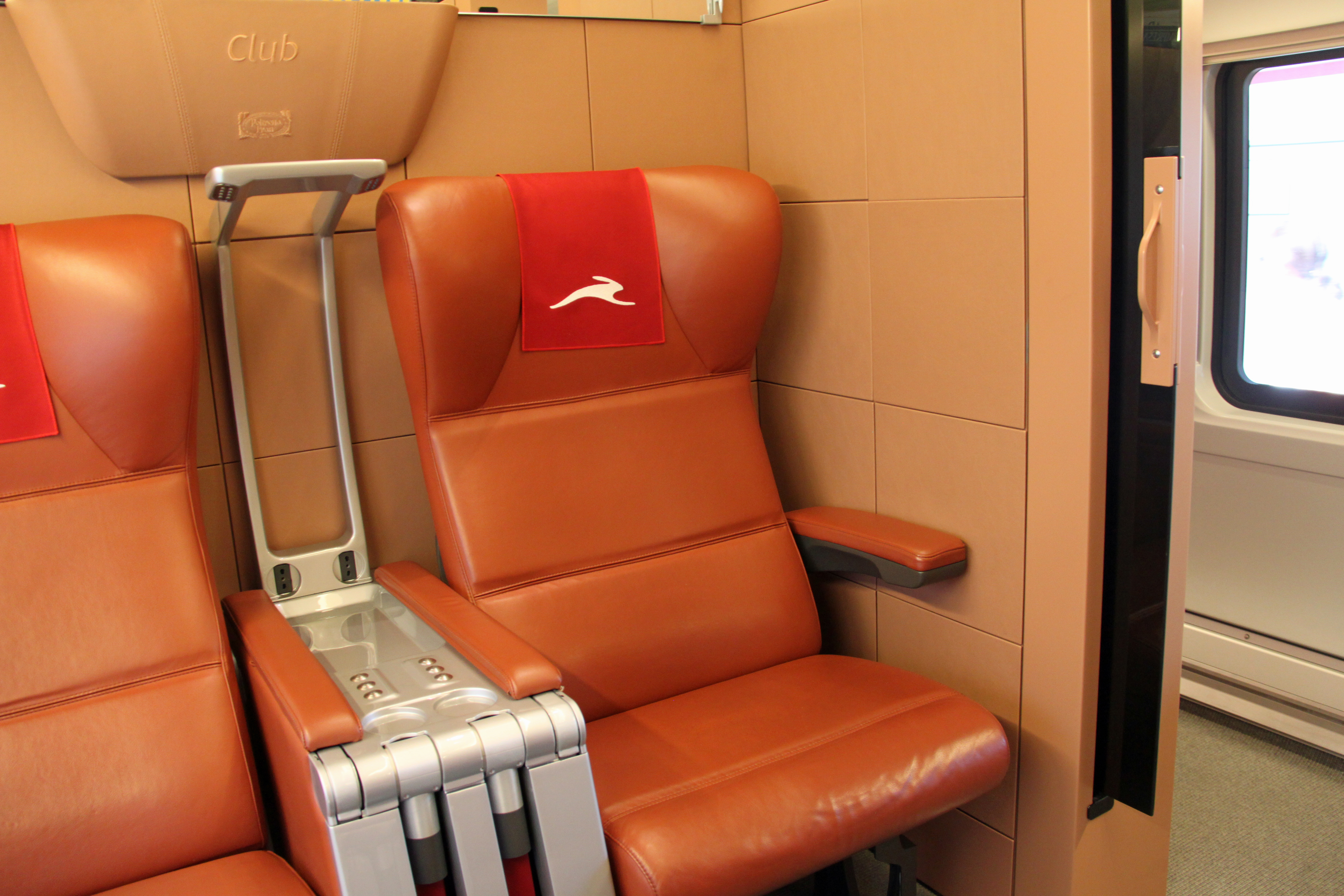
Club Executive Class aboard an Italo AGV trainset.

Italo offers three classes of service aboard its trains:

- Smart Class - standard 2x2 seating without additional amenities
- Prima Business Class - wider seats in a 2x1 layout, snack service and fast track access
- Club Executive Class - large armchair seats with individual entertainment screens, additional catering, fast track and access to Italo Club lounges at major stations

Free Wi-Fi is available in all areas. In addition to the aforementioned catering, there are food and drink vending machines aboard all trains.

== Routes ==
Routes served by NTV are those of the Italian high-speed rail network. As of 2024, the network consists of several routes, for a total of over 90 daily trips serving 54 cities and 62 stations:

- Turin - Milan - Bologna - Florence - Rome - Naples - Salerno - Agropoli Castellabate - Vallo della Lucania - Sapri - Maratea - Scalea - Paola - Lamezia Terme - Vibo Pizzo - Rosarno - Villa San Giovanni - Reggio Calabria
- Venice - Padua - Ferrara - Bologna - Florence - Rome - Naples - Salerno
- Brescia - Verona - Bologna - Florence - Rome - Naples - Salerno
- Turin - Milan - Brescia - Verona - Vicenza - Padua - Venezia
- Bolzano - Trento - Verona - Bologna - Florence - Rome
- Bergamo - Brescia - Verona - Bologna - Florence - Rome - Naples
- Naples - Rome - Florence - Bologna - Ferrara - Padua - Venice - Treviso - Conegliano - Pordenone - Udine
- Milan - Bologna - Rimini - Riccione - Pesaro - Ancona
- Naples – Rome – Florence – Forlì – Cesena – Rimini – Riccione – Cattolica – Pesaro
- Turin - Milan - Reggio Emilia - Bologna - Florence - Rome - Caserta - Benevento - Foggia - Barletta - Trani – Bisceglie – Molfetta - Bari
- Naples - Rome - Florence - Bologna - Rovigo - Padua - Venice - Portogruaro - Latisana - Monfalcone - Trieste

== History ==
=== Background ===
The company was created in 2006 by Luca Cordero di Montezemolo, Diego Della Valle, Gianni Punzo and Francesco Sciarrone to compete on Italian high-speed rail operator given the liberalization of the railway sector in the European Union. The company was launched with an initial investment of €967 million, €625 million of which was spent on rolling stock. NTV's shareholders took on significant risk in their startup as Italy was the first country in the world to open its high-speed rail market to competition.

In January 2008 NTV changed its corporate structure with the entry of Intesa Sanpaolo, followed in October of the same year by the Société Nationale des Chemins de fer Français (SNCF); in the same year the railway company ordered to Alstom the construction of twenty-five trains of the Automotrice à grande vitesse (AGV) type, which were built in the plants of La Rochelle and Savigliano.

In early 2010, NTV stated its intention to start services in late 2011, following the certification of its trains in mid-2011. In March 2011, the company publicly complained that the Italian rail infrastructure manager, Rete Ferroviaria Italiana (RFI), was obstructing its plans to run trains by making last-minute changes to network statements, as well as questioning the legality of its access charges. RFI is controlled by the same government group that controls Trenitalia, the incumbent provider of passenger train services in Italy. Later that year, it was reported that the launch date had been delayed into 2012; this was reportedly due to the project's complexity.

According to industry consultant Andrea Giuricin, NTV found it difficult to obtain technical approval and safety licences to operate its new fleet of Alstom-built Automotrice à grande vitesse (AGV) trains; Giuricin also acknowledged the establishment process as being quite complex in general. Italy needed to refine its regulatory structures so that private rail operators could achieve a level playing field. Disputes over access to both station facilities and train paths were symptomatic of NTV's early years. In October 2013, the Italian Competition Authority determined that both Trenitalia and RFI had made deliberate efforts to exclude NTV. A suitable independent regulator of the Italian rail industry was not established until late 2013.

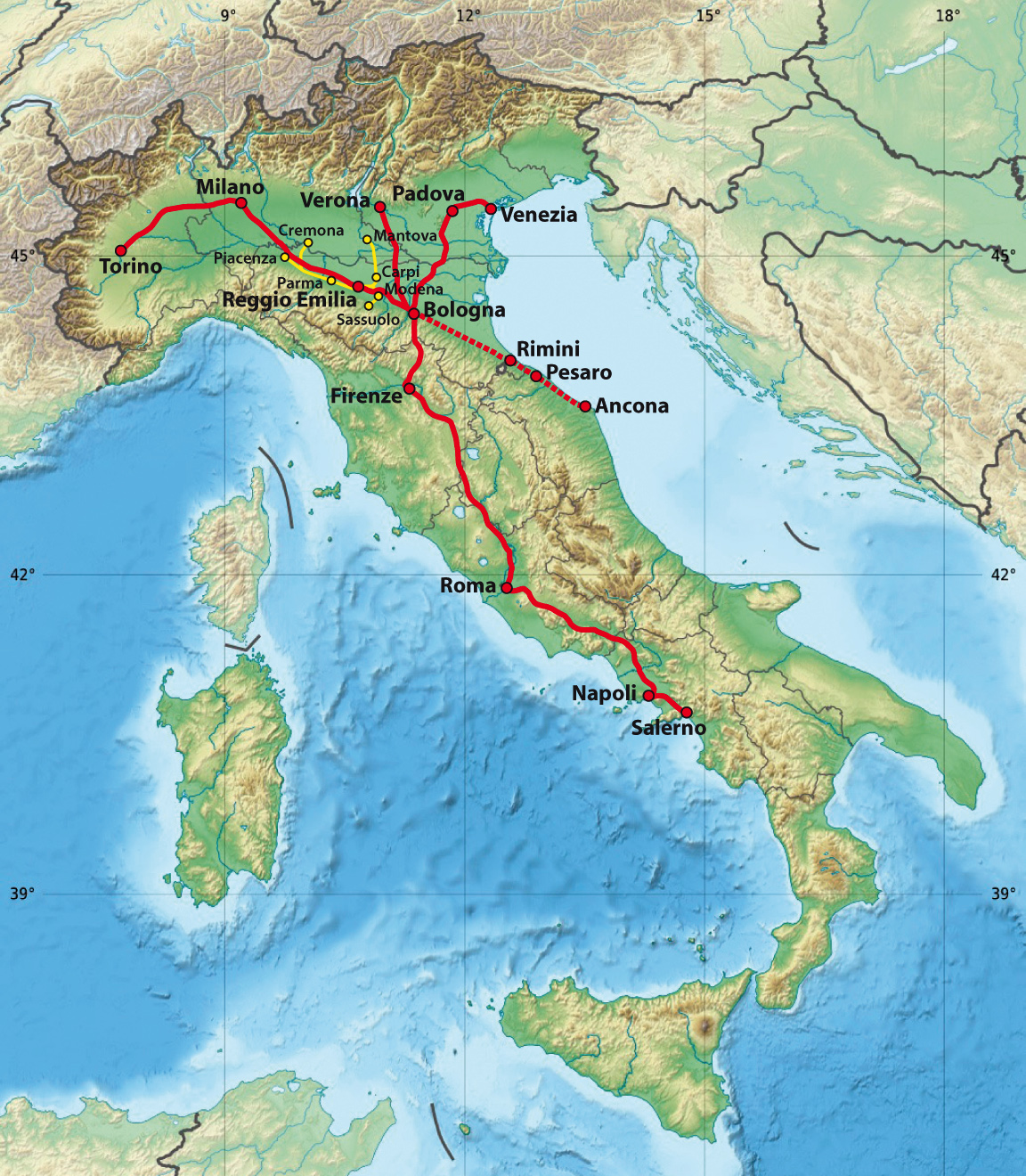
Routes of NTV

On 28 April 2012, NTV conducted its first service, which it launched under the .italo brand. This branding has been applied to other services provided by the company, such as its loyalty card. In its first year of operation, NTV claimed its ridership to have been 2,051,702.

According to rail periodical Railway Gazette, NTV was initially challenged to achieve a viable return on investment until passenger numbers increased. Ridership increased in the following years, carrying 9.1 million passengers in 2015, having attained a load factor of 71.5%. By this point, NTV was operating 56 trains daily. In October 2012 there was a change of leadership: Montezemolo left the office of president while remaining a shareholder of the company, while Vincenzo Cannatelli resigned as vice president, remaining within the board of directors. The presidency was succeeded by Antonello Perricone, who since 2 October 2013, is also CEO, following the resignation of Giuseppe Sciarrone.

During 2015, NTV then-CEO Flavio Cattaneo launched a strategic turnaround initiative, aimed at improving its operations. In 2016, passenger numbers increased again, reaching 11 million. To expand accessibility to its services, NTV has coordinated with bus operators to expand its catchment area to cover towns not directly served by high-speed rail.

That same year, NTV attained its fiscal break-even point for the first time, becoming profitable thereafter. According to Giuricin, NTV quickly became a profitable venture largely due to an efficient and innovative approach to the market; such measures include a high utilisation rate of its rolling stock, typically high load factors for services, and customer engagement efforts. Partially in response to NTV's presence, incumbent operator Trenitalia has also made changes to increase competitiveness. In August 2018, RFI was fined €620,000 for anti-competitive practices favouring Trenitalia over NTV.

In January 2018, it was announced 35-40% of NTV's shares would be listed on the Borsa Italiana. However, in February 2018, the planned initial public offering was cancelled; instead, NTV's shareholders accepted the take-over offer from Global Infrastructure Partners for 100% of the company, which was then valued at €1.94 billion. Dealing April 2018, the sale was finalised; several of the existing shareholders chose to participate in a capital increase for a joint shareholding of 7.74%. That same year, the company was renamed Italo-NTV, which integrated the .italo brand present on its rolling stock.

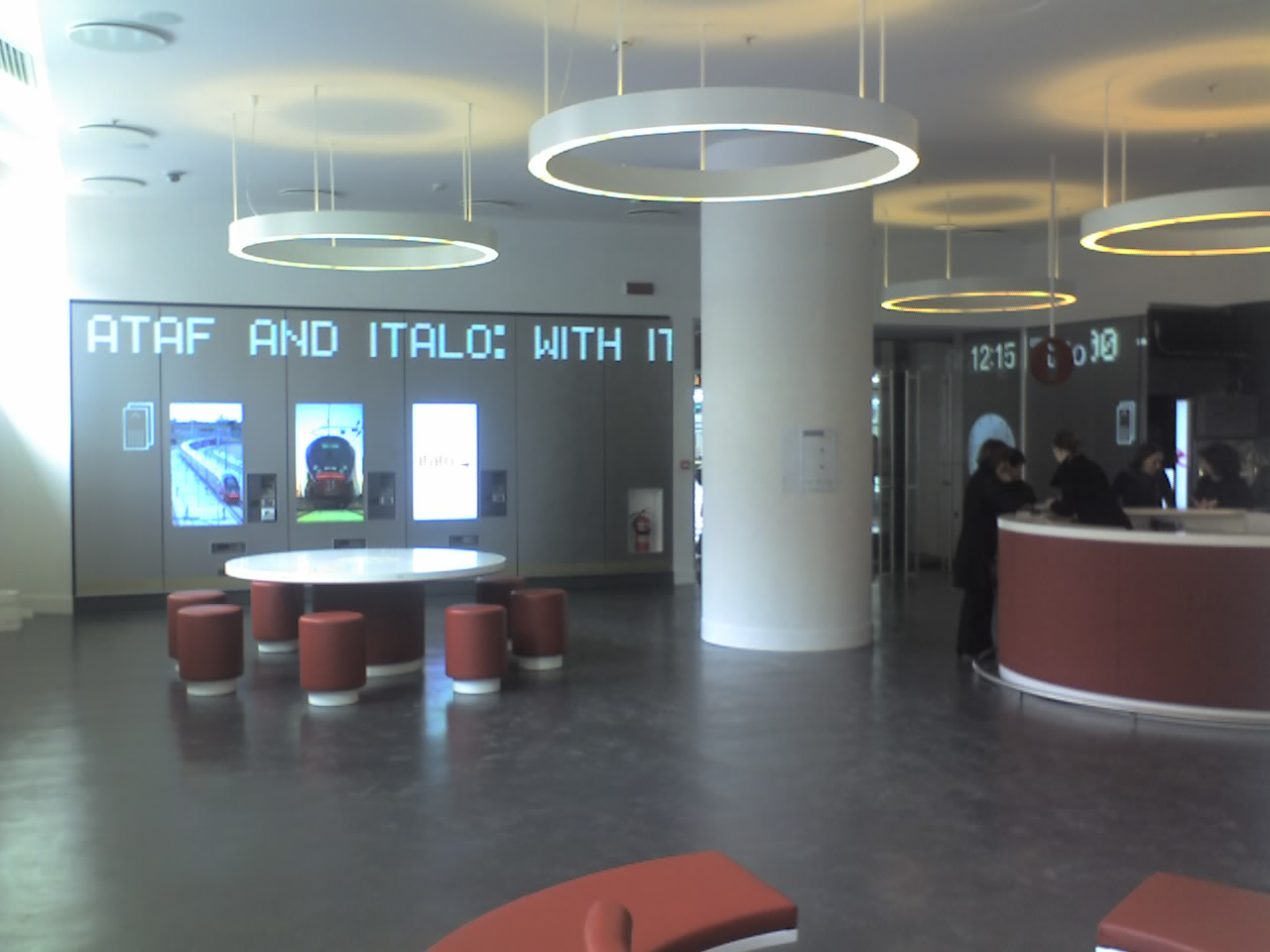
NTV lounge at Firenze Santa Maria Novella railway station

Italian ticket prices have fallen considerably since NTV's commencement of services in 2012; by 2019, the company had achieved a lower cost per available seat-km than most budget airlines, helping the company take market share from competing air routes. Just as NTV's customer numbers grew rapidly in its initial five years, Italian demand for high-speed rail travel in general has doubled in the same time period. Specifically, rail operators' market share of the Rome – Milan route has increased from 36% in 2008 to an estimated 80% in 2018, while airline's share has dropped from 50% to just 14% between the same dates.

By the late 2010s, NTV was considering launching services outside of Italy; Luca Cordero di Montezemolo, the company's chairman, has stated that possibly future markets for the firm include Spain, Germany and the United Kingdom. According to Giuricin, the future of such ambitions on the part of NTV and other private operators is dependent upon the establishment of an appropriate, stable, and clear regulatory environment, particularly in regards to track access charges.

In October 2023, Mediterranean Shipping Company (MSC) acquired a 50% stake in Italo.

In July 2026, Italo signed a contract worth approximately €3 billion with Siemens Mobility for 26 high-speed trains, with an option for 14 more, as part of its planned expansion into Germany. The company planned to begin operating 50 daily services connecting 18 German cities by mid-2028, with routes linking Munich to Cologne and Dortmund, and Munich to Berlin and Hamburg.

== Rolling stock ==
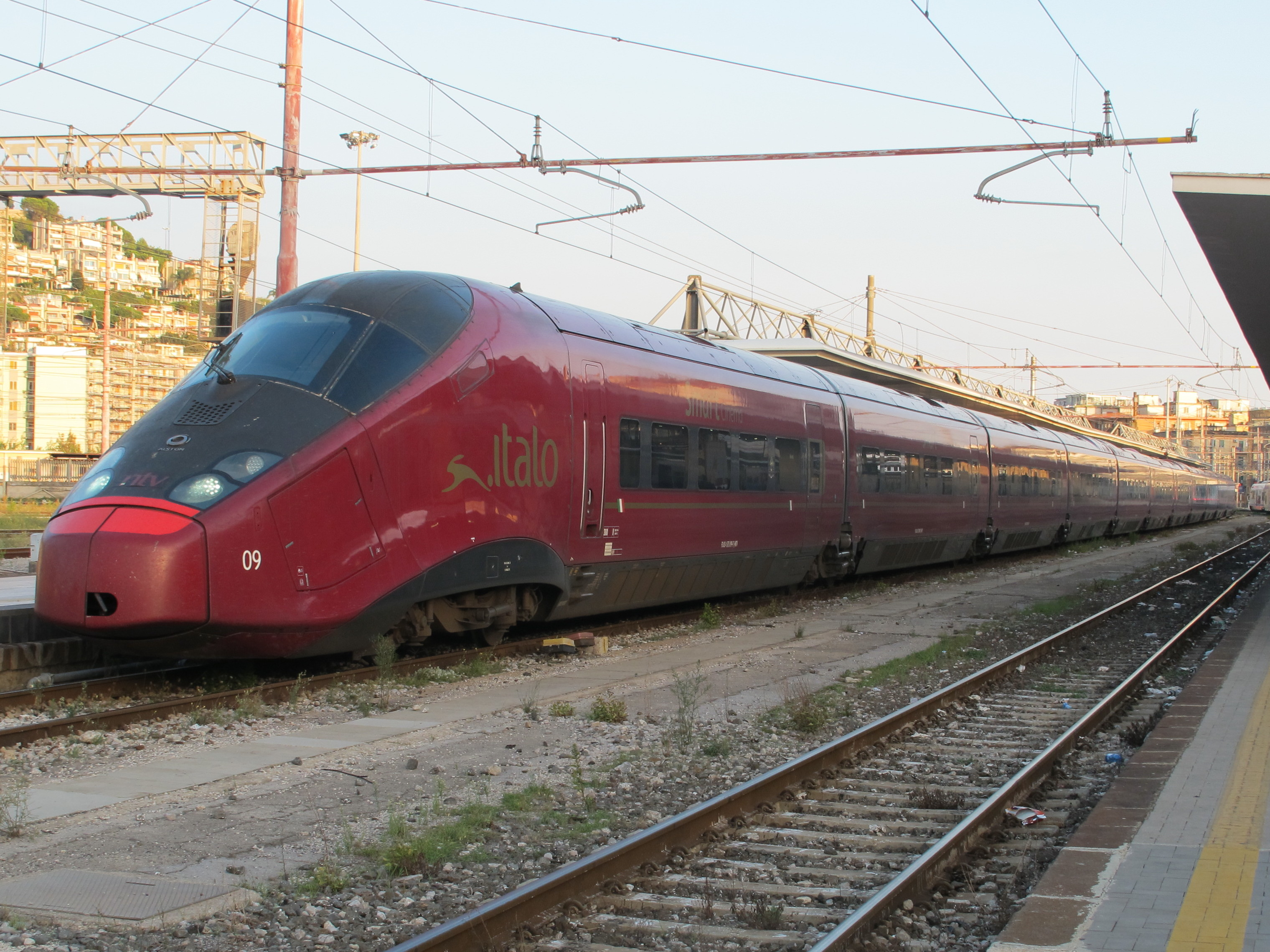
AGV Italo trainset

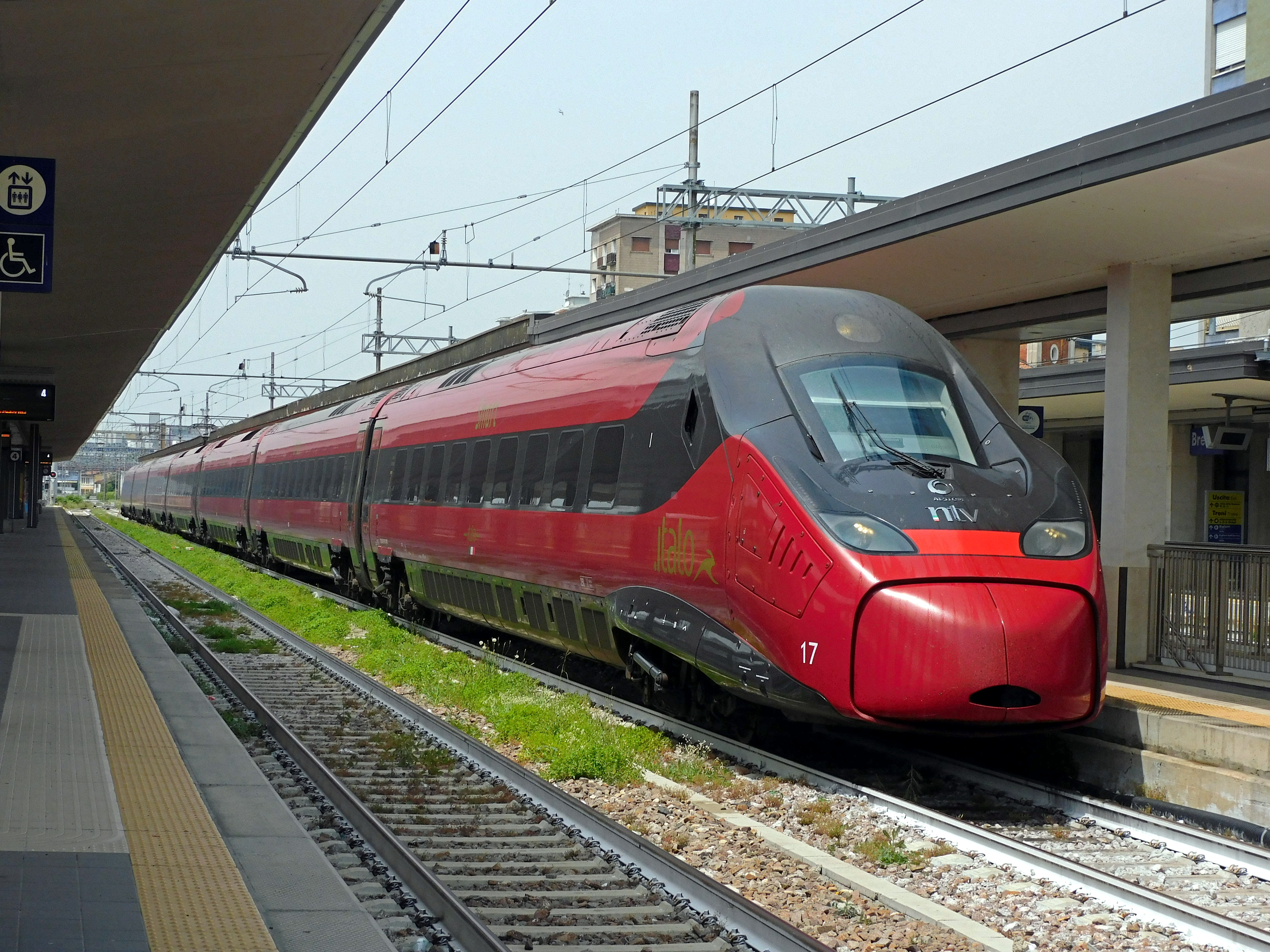
ETR 675 Italo trainset

=== AGV ===
On 17 January 2008, it was announced by French industrial conglomerate Alstom that NTV had placed an order for 25 AGV trainsets, each having a length of 11 cars. Alstom manufactured 17 AGVs at its La Rochelle plant in France, while the remaining eight trains were assembled at Savigliano in Italy. The contract included maintenance of the fleet for 30 years, as well as an option to procure a further ten trains. NTV unveiled the first of its trains in a ceremony on 13 December 2011.

=== New Pendolino ===
In 2015, NTV announced the procurement of twelve additional trains (classified as ETR 675) to expand its fleet. These additional units would be from Alstom's Avelia Pendolino family, the maximum speed of which being approximately 50 km/h slower than NTV's existing AGVs. The procurement is intended to allow NTV to expand its existing Italo services, as well as offer services to new destinations. On 3 October 2013, the first of NTV's Pendolino was publicly presented at the Expo Ferroviaria exhibition in Milan, by which point the trainset was participating in certification trials ahead of entering passenger service. Further Pendolinos were ordered by NTV; as of October 2019, the company operates a fleet of 25 AGVs and 26 non-tilting Pendolinos (ordered by exercising contractual options).

== See also ==
- High-speed rail in Italy
- Rete Ferroviaria Italiana (RFI), owner and operator of the Italian rail infrastructure
- Trenitalia, the Italian state-owned train operating company
- Treno Alta Velocità (owned by RFI), in charge of high speed rail infrastructure in Italy
