= AGV (train) =

High speed train model

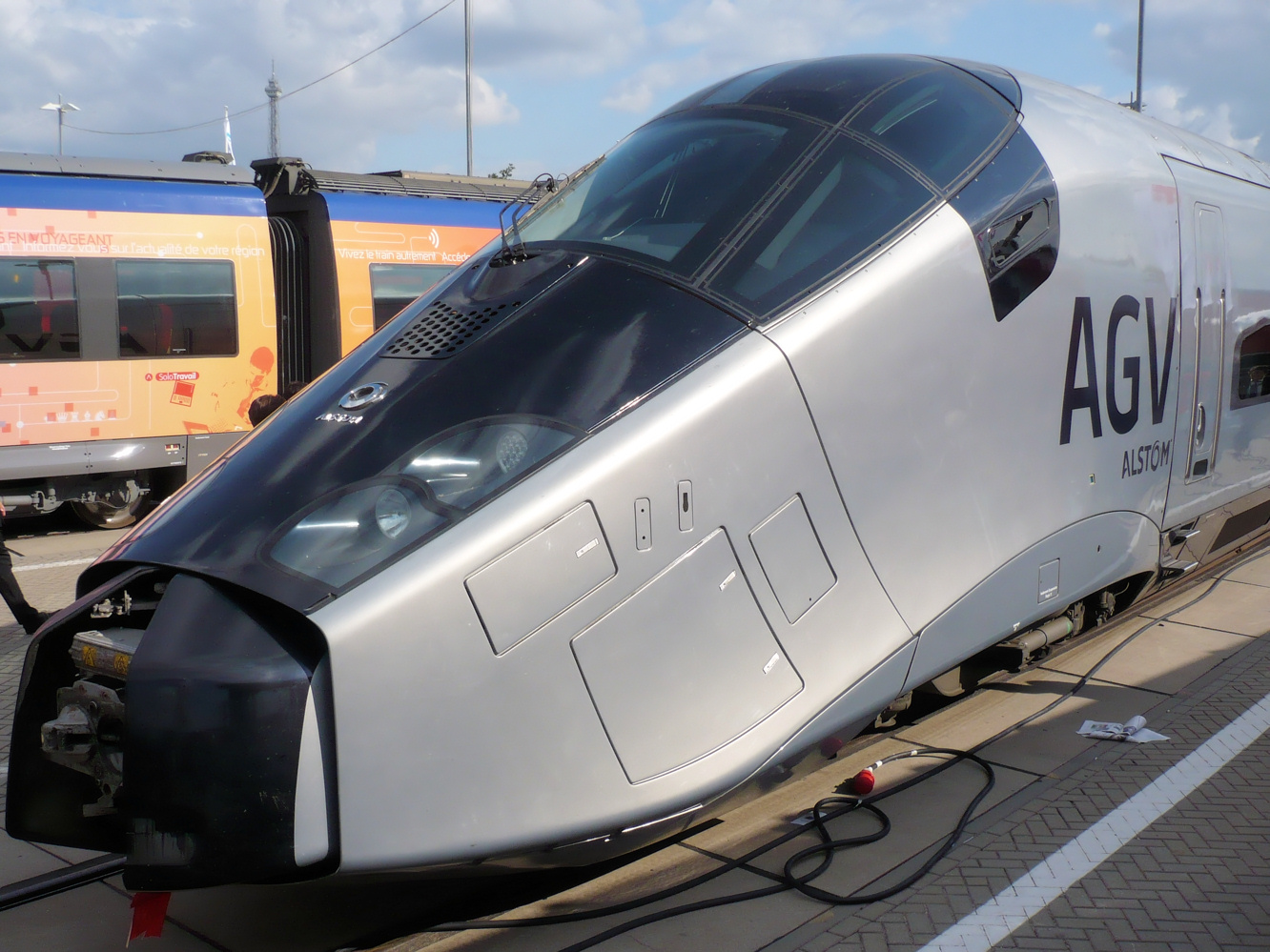
- AGV Pégase at Innotrans 2008
- Stock type: Electric multiple unit
- Manufacturer: Alstom

Specifications
- Car body construction: Aluminium with carbon composite in articulation section (Note: The NTV trainsets ordered 2008 have a conventional steel beam.)
- Train length: 132 m (433 ft 7/8 in) (7 car) (Note: Specifications refer to a 7-car unit, original Pégase prototype, with 50% of the axles motorised. Where sources conflict more recent value is taken. Sources:)
- Car length: Intermediate: 17.3 m (56 ft 9 in) end car length: 17.1 m (56 ft 1 in) end car pivot distance: 17.1 m (56 ft 1 in)
- Width: 2.985 m (9 ft 9.5 in)
- Floor height: 1,155 mm (45.5 in) (Note: In the Pégase prototype the floor height above the bogie the height rises 95 mm from 1,155 mm to 1,250 mm.)
- Maximum speed: 360 km/h (224 mph) at 25 kV 50 Hz AC; 320 km/h (199 mph) at 15 kV 16 2/3 Hz; 250 km/h (155 mph) at 3 kV DC; 200 km/h (124 mph) at 1.5 kV DC
- Weight: 272 t (7 car)
- Traction system: Floor-mounted Alstom ONIX IGBT-VVVF
- Traction motors: 8× Alstom 12 LCS 3550 C
- Power output: 6.080 MW (Note: Initially rated at 5.76 MW with 720 kW motors. By 2008 the traction motors were specified at 760 kW continuous.)
- Electric systems: 25 kV 50 Hz AC; 15 kV 16.7 Hz AC; 1,500 V DC; 3,000 V DC
- Current collection: Pantograph
- UIC classification: Bo'(2)(2)(Bo')(Bo')(2)(2)Bo'
- Bogies: Jacobs bogies; 3 m (9.8 ft) wheelbase
- Track gauge: 1,435 mm (4 ft 8 1/2 in) standard gauge

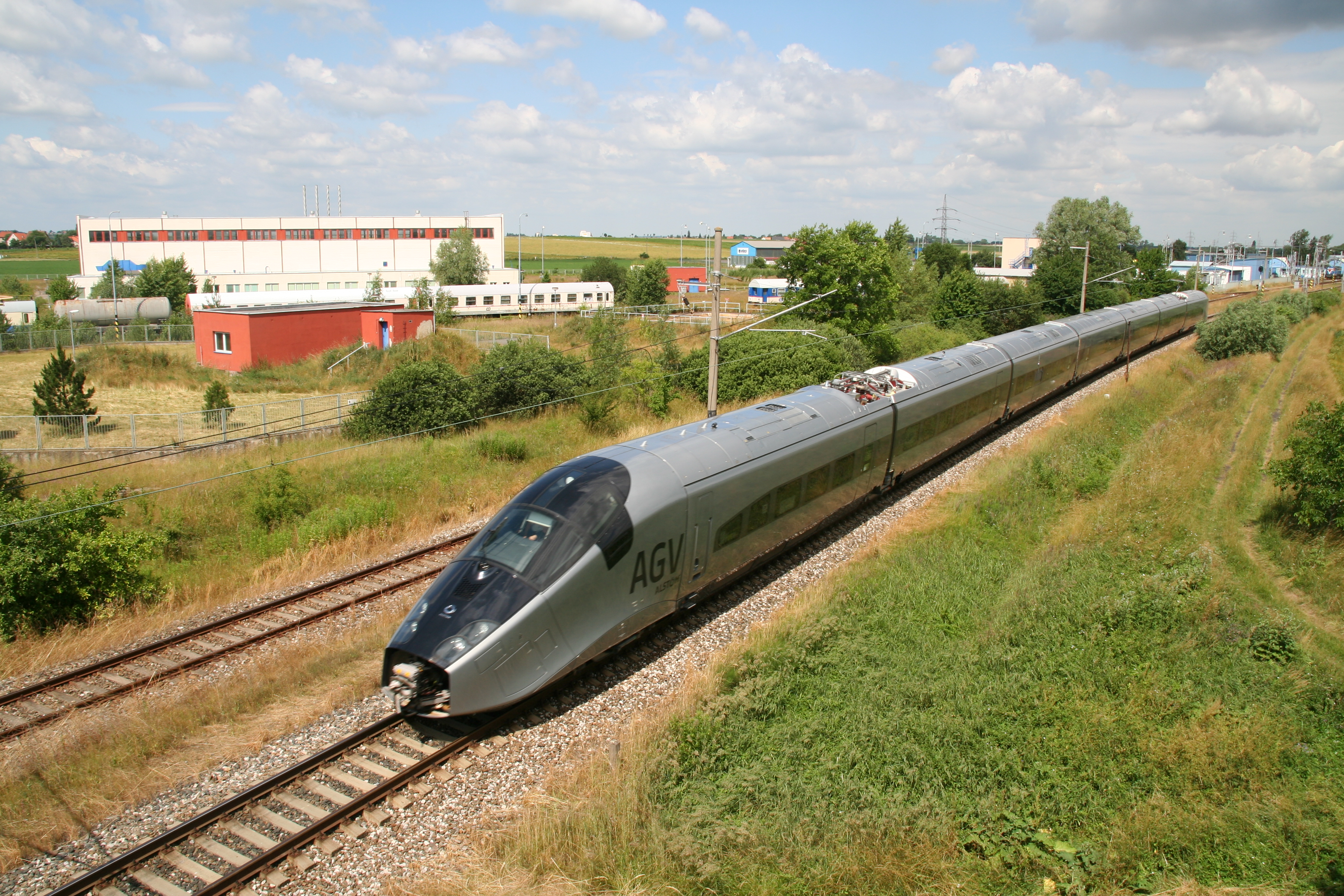
Alstom AGV during a test run

The AGV (acronym for French: Automotrice à grande vitesse; lit. "high-speed railcar") is a French standard gauge, high-speed, electric multiple-unit train designed and built by Alstom.

Alstom offers the AGV in configurations from seven to fourteen carriages, with seating that can carry as much as 245 to 446 people. The trains are constructed from units comprising three cars (each with one transformer and two traction electronics packages located underneath the cars) and single-car driver-trailers. The maximum commercial speed is 360 km/h (220 mph).

Design of the train took place through the early 2000s, with a prototype, "Pégase", produced in 2008. Italian transport company NTV ordered 25 trains in 2008 (classified as AGV 575) with services beginning in 2012.

According to Alstom, the advantages of the AGV are: increased seating area per train length (compared to a single-deck TGV); safety and maintenance advantages of the Jacobs bogie articulation design as well as higher energy efficiency from permanent-magnet synchronous motors.

== History and design ==
The first design studies relating to the AGV were made in 1998. An AGV design, initially named "TGV 400", was presented in Barcelona in early 2000 as part of Alstom's bid to supply high-speed trains for the Madrid–Barcelona high-speed rail line. Initial specifications were for a train with distributed traction (total power 7.2 MW), seating 359 in a train 180 m (590 ft 7 in) long, with a version including eddy current brakes with a top speed of 350 km/h (220 mph), and a tilting version with a top speed of 320 km/h (200 mph). The design would retain the articulated Jacobs bogie of the TGV.

Unlike the TGV, which was developed in collaboration between Alstom and SNCF, the AGV was developed wholly at Alstom's expense, with European Union rules on state aid limiting the extent of financial collaboration between the state-owned SNCF and Alstom. The AGV was promoted in 2002 as a complementary high-speed train to the TGV Duplex, offering higher speeds for less busy train paths, while a double-decker AGV was posited as a future possibility by Alstom.

The new design was the first high-speed train design in modern times that had inter-vehicle articulation and distributed traction. (Note: The Electroliners, introduced by the Chicago North Shore and Milwaukee Railroad, USA in 1941 had inter-coach articulation in a multiple unit that had no locomotive, and a top speed of over 160 km/h (100 mph).) The design used Alstom ONIX IGBT-based traction inverters; the weight reduction associated with IGBT technology allowed an axle load of within 17 tonnes per axle. The trainsets were to be made up of modules of 3-car sets with two powered bogies per module. Each motor bogie had two body-mounted self-ventilated motors, one per axle, rated at 600 kW. The traction electronics used two taps per transformer per module, each powering two parallel connected inverters, with a separate inverter for each motor. There were two carriage designs: the driving control cars, and intermediate cars; and two designs of bogie: powered and unpowered.

The initial AGV design incorporated a number of new features: an electrically activated active suspension (in the transverse direction to movement), used to limit oscillations between car and bogie; and eddy current brakes, fitted to the end bogies. Both technologies had been previously trialled on TGV sets. The carriages were constructed from aluminium alloy as used on the TGV Duplex. The transformers, which weigh 6.5 tonnes, are fitted underneath the end cars, since the presence of the leading bogie allows the mass to be distributed over three instead of two axles. The interior structure was designed to allow easier refurbishment and alteration to the passenger environment. The floor level is kept practically constant throughout the train, including at inter-coach connections.

By 2005, permanent-magnet synchronous motor technology had become mature enough to use in a commercial product, and was incorporated into the design allowing a bogie-mounted (instead of frame-mounted) traction motor, with higher efficiency and lower overall weight. The 2005 specifications allowed a wider (3 m (9 ft 10 in)) carriage than the TGV, with a correspondingly shorter coach length. Alstom claimed operating and capital costs per seat were the same as a TGV Duplex.

In 2007 a modified TGV Duplex, the 'V150', fitted with AGV-type bogies, traction electronics and traction motors (operating at 1 MW) set a new rail speed record of 574.8 km/h (357.2 mph).

The design was complete enough to be frozen by July 2006. It had become formalised at basic train lengths of 7 or 14 cars, with the 3-car modules remaining part of the design. Each 3-car module had either a transformer or one of two traction modules (inverters) located beneath a carriage. Additional trailer vehicles (referred to as 'key' cars) were to extend the train size beyond multiples of three. The train is able to operate under all four European electrification systems, with a top speed specified at 360 km/h (220 mph) under 25 kV electrification, 320 km/h (200 mph) under 15 kV 16 2/3 Hz supply, and further reduced to 250 km/h (160 mph) and 200 km/h (120 mph) under 3 kV and 1.5 kV respectively.

The bogies are related to the type used on the TGV trains; in addition to the changes to traction motor type and installation, the bogies are constructed of a high tensile steel, for lighter weight, the bogie wheelbase is 3m as with the TGV. Braking is by rheostatic braking and regenerative braking, in addition to triple disc brakes on trailer bogies for low speed braking. An eddy current brake was not fitted. The train also incorporates a carbon composite as a structural element, forming a U beam which supports the carriage body end on the secondary suspension.

In January 2008 NTV (Italy) ordered twenty-five eleven-car trains for €650 million for use on the Italian rail network.

The prototype Pégase AGV was unveiled in February 2008, by which time Alstom had invested approximately €100 million in the development program.

The SNCF has not adopted the AGV for commercial use, preferring to expand its fleet of TGV Duplex.

=== Prototypes ===
==== Elisa test train, 2001 ====
By May 2000, prototype vehicles were being constructed for testing in 2001. Two coaches were constructed; a driving and an intermediate cab, with both trailer and motor bogies; for testing the units were attached to a four car TGV Reseau set. The test train (named "Elisa") began tests in late 2001; including ride and noise level measurements, as well as testing of a multisystem "Europantograph", designed to work with all four European overhead electrification systems. Dynamic tests included measuring traction motor, braking rheostat, transformer and inverter cooling under high-speed conditions, as well as aerodynamic tests on airconditioning system performance at high speed. Initial tests were complete in May 2002.

==== Pégase demonstrator, 2008 ====
By 2004, enabled by the availability of rare-earth magnets with high magnetic strength, Alstom had developed permanent-magnet synchronous motors (PMSM) which were suitable for rail vehicles. They were smaller and had a higher efficiency than asynchronous motors and a higher power-to-weight ratio, as well as having the potential for lower noise levels. The AGV was one of the early applications of the new motor design, using 720 kW prototype motors weighing 730 kg. By 2008 the motor's continuous power rating had been respecified to 760 kW.

In late 2005 Alstom began the process of constructing a 7-car AGV demonstration train fitted with PMSMs, with half the bogies powered. The demonstration vehicle, named Pégase (Prototype Evolutif Grande vitesse Automotrice Standard Européen) was assembled at Alstom's La Rochelle plant, with bogies built at Alstom's Le Creusot plant. The prototype was unveiled on 5 February 2008, at La Rochelle, in the presence of president Nicolas Sarkozy.

The transformers were mounted in the driving cars, with the other two cars of the three car modules each carrying a traction converter (ONIX 233 water cooled), which also integrate auxiliary converters, the middle 'key' car carried auxiliary equipment under the carriage. The HVAC equipment is mounted on the roof. The internal DC inverter power bus is supplied at 3600 V DC.

The unit began a four-month dynamic testing programme at speeds up to 210 km/h (130 mph) on the Velim railway test circuit in the Czech Republic in mid-2008.

Testing over four weekends on the LGV Est high-speed line began in late 2008; the train completed 7500 km of test runs, after which it returned to the Velim test track for tests relating to certification for NTV's trainsets in Italy, including SCMT safety system integration.

In 2010 the AGV test train began testing in Italy, reaching 300 km/h (190 mph) on the Rome-Naples high-speed line. Dynamic tests were completed by March 2010.

== Customers ==
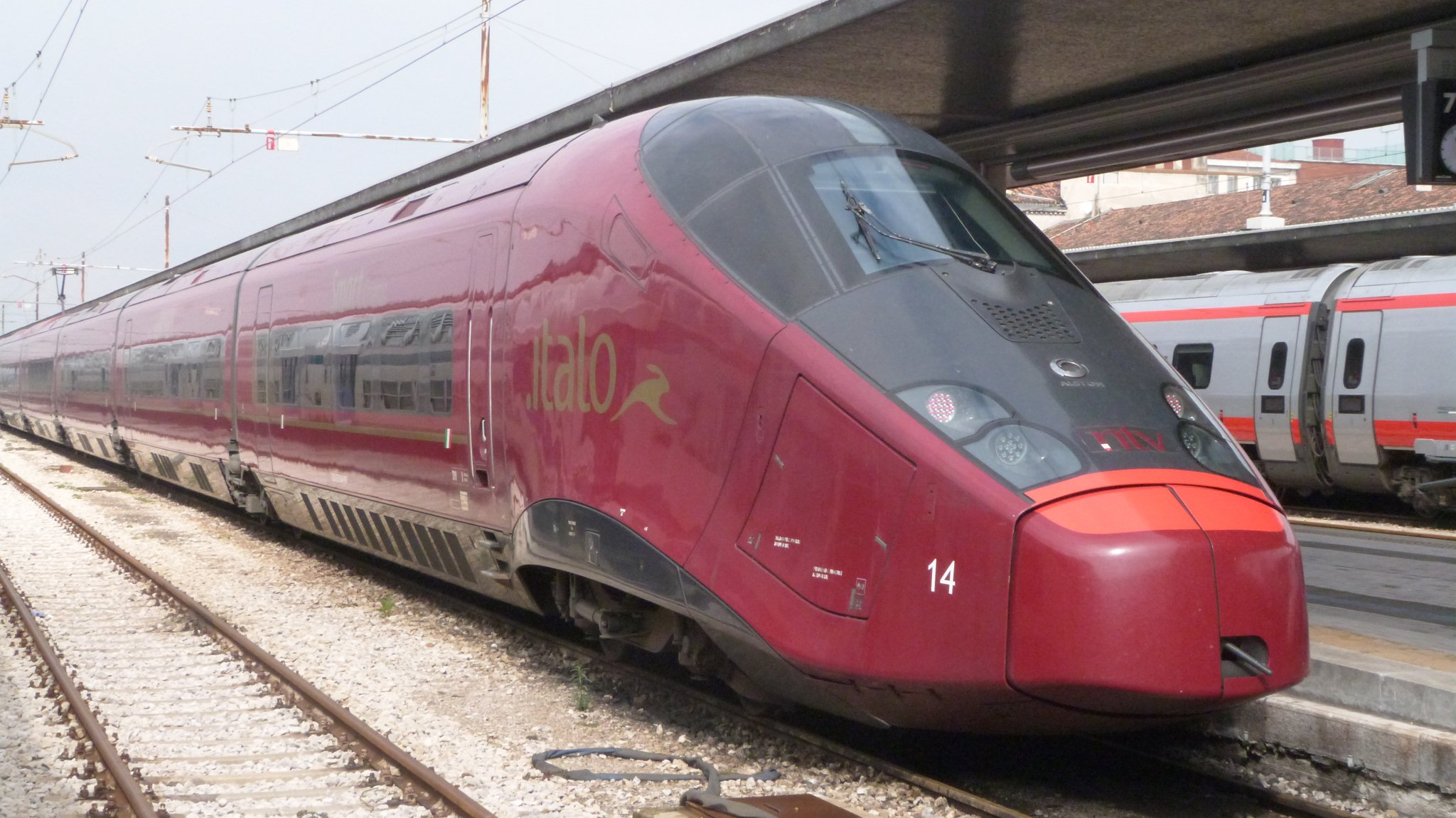
NTV Alstom AGV 575

=== NTV ===
Alstom's only customer for the AGV was Italian company Nuovo Trasporto Viaggiatori (NTV).

Alstom submitted its bid to supply NTV with high-speed trains in March 2006. On 17 January 2008 NTV ordered 25 eleven-coach, 460-seat AGV trains, for €650 million. The order included an option for ten more trainsets. 17 trains were to be built at Alstom's La Rochelle plant, the remaining 8 at Alstom's plant in Savigliano, Italy. (Note: The number of units to be produced at Savigliano was reduced to 8 by 2011, with La Rochelle having manufactured 17 trainsets.) An additional contract for maintenance of the trains over a thirty-year period involved the construction of a maintenance depot at Nola, Italy.

The company planned to launch a variety of services on the Turin - Milan - Bologna, Rome - Venice, and Bologna - Florence - Rome - Naples high-speed lines, with some trains from Naples running to Bari. Initial services were planned for mid-2011 based on the delivery of the first trains in September 2010. The NTV livery was unveiled in July 2008.

The buildings at the €90-million AGV maintenance facility were completed by May 2010; construction of the first NTV AGV trainset was completed on 10 May 2010. However, in March 2011 NTV announced it was to postpone service start from the planned start date of September 2011 due to delays with the train certification. This start date had moved to 2012 by November 2011. The first AGV produced at Savigliano was handed over in November 2011. By December 2011 certification testing was complete. On 30 March 2012 NTV announced its first Italo service would begin on the Naples to Milan rail lines on 28 April 2012; the service would be the first open access high-speed train service in the world.

The Italo NTV trains feature internet connectivity, TV and a cinema for passengers in three classes.

The service launched on 28 April 2012, and carried 45,000 passengers by 21 May 2012, with an average passenger loading of 41%.

== Avelia ==
In 2008 the President of Alstom Transport, Philippe Mellier, stated that an 'AGV Duplex' would be developed, and would become Alstom's double deck train offer (for SNCF) after the TGV 2N2. In June 2011 Les Échos reported that Alstom was developing a new high speed train, "AGV II" with a top speed of between 380 and 400 km/h (240 and 250 mph), to be available as a single and a double deck version. The design was to utilise power/traction equipment in a single unit (locomotive) as previously used in the TGV design, rather than distributed traction. The traction locomotive design was thought to be aimed in part at orders from SNCF as early as 2014/5 or post 2015.

In 2015 Alstom and ADEME (Agence de l'environnement et de la maîtrise de l'énergie) formed a joint venture, 'SpeedInnov', with the aim of developing the next generation high speed train for France.

In October 2015 the technology was grouped into the series of Avelia branded products for Alstom's high-speed trains, consisting of the existing Pendolino, Euroduplex and AGV offers. At that time NTV bought 8 Pendolino high-speed trains with the Avelia Pendolino having a maximum speed of 250 km/h (155 mph). In August 2016 Amtrak and Alstom announced that the Avelia Liberty trainset had been chosen to replace the existing Bombardier-Alstom Acela Express trainsets on the Northeast Corridor between Boston and Washington, D.C. via New York City and Philadelphia. The Avelia Liberty will combine Pendolino active tilting at a speed up to 300 km/h (186 mph) and it can reach a maximum speed of 350 km/h (217 mph) without tilting. The trainset has two power cars at the front and rear, similar to TGV.

The cooperation with the SNCF led into a contract for 100 Avelia Horizon double deck trains in August 2018, which are based on TGV Duplex. These trains have a top speed of 350 kilometres per hour (220 mph) as well.

== Preservation ==
Alstom donated an intermediate car of the Pégase demonstrator to the National College for High Speed Rail (NCHSR) in Britain. The car was moved from Alstom's La Rochelle plant to NCHSR's Doncaster campus in early December 2018, where it will be used in courses.

One of the front car of the same train was monumented outside Alstom's La Rochelle plant and painted in a modern livery resembling the new Avelia trains.

== See also ==
- Alstom
- List of high-speed trains
