= Velim (Kolín District) =

- Municipality
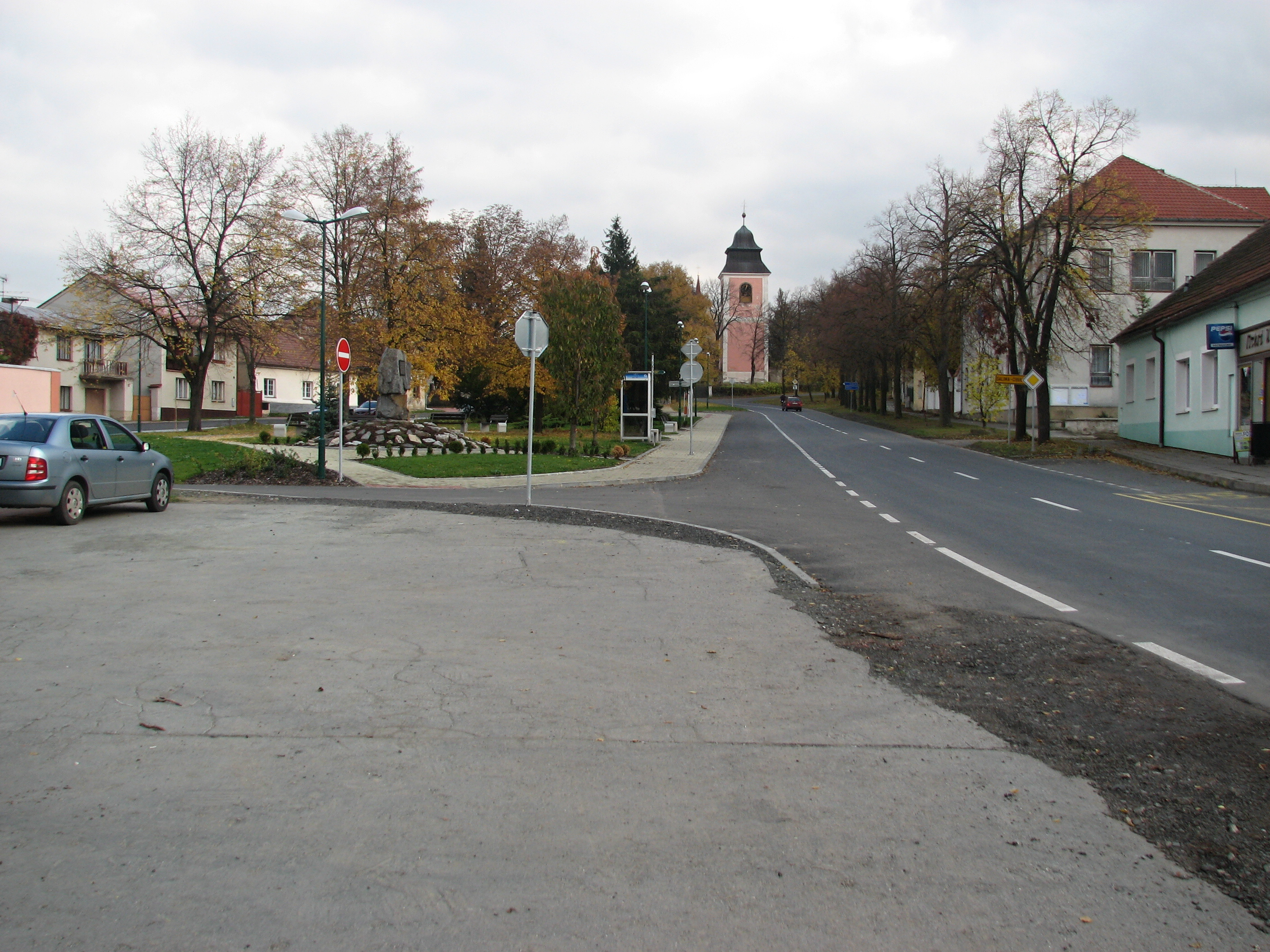
- Centre of Velim

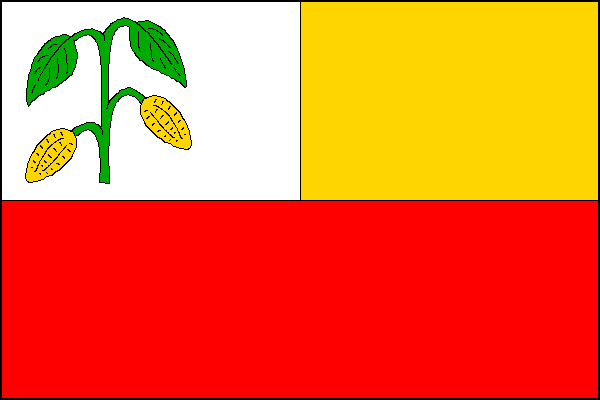
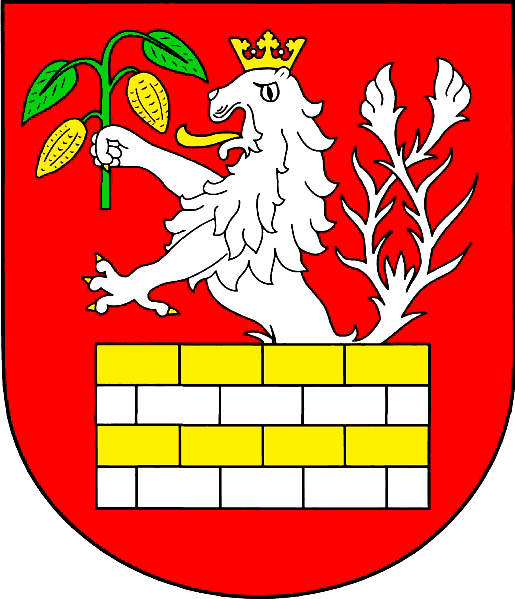
- Flag Coat of arms

- Location in the Czech Republic
- Coordinates: 50°3′35″N 15°11′11″E
- Country: Czech Republic
- Region: Central Bohemian
- District: Kolín
- First mentioned: 1323

Area
  - Total: 15.72 km^{2} (6.07 sq mi)
- Elevation: 203 m (666 ft)

Population (2026-01-01)
  - Total: 2,215
  - Density: 140.9/km^{2} (364.9/sq mi)
- Time zone: UTC+1 (CET)
  - Summer (DST): UTC+2 (CEST)
- Postal code: 281 01
- Website: www.velim.cz

Velim is a municipality and village in Kolín District in the Central Bohemian Region of the Czech Republic. It has about 2,200 inhabitants.

== Administrative division ==
Velim consists of two municipal parts (in brackets population according to the 2021 census):

- Velim (2,001)
- Vítězov (237)

== Etymology ==
The oldest name of the village was Velyně. It was derived from the personal name Vela, meaning "Vela's hamlet". In the second half of the 14th century, the name was distorted to Velim and this form then completely prevailed.

== Geography ==
Velim is located about 7 kilometres (4 mi) northwest of Kolín and 40 km (25 mi) east of Prague. It lies in a flat agricultural landscape in the Central Elbe Table.

== History ==
The first written mention of Velim is in a deed of King John of Bohemia from 1323. According to legend, Velim was first mentioned in 999, when Duke Boleslaus II donated the area to his son Oldřich. The railway was built in 1843. The construction of the railway started the development of the village and industrialisation.

== Demographics ==
Historical population

| Year | Pop. | ±% |
|---|---|---|
| 1869 | 1,419 | — |
| 1880 | 1,821 | +28.3% |
| 1890 | 1,962 | +7.7% |
| 1900 | 2,170 | +10.6% |
| 1910 | 2,392 | +10.2% |

| Year | Pop. | ±% |
|---|---|---|
| 1921 | 2,395 | +0.1% |
| 1930 | 2,425 | +1.3% |
| 1950 | 2,306 | −4.9% |
| 1961 | 2,392 | +3.7% |
| 1970 | 2,243 | −6.2% |

| Year | Pop. | ±% |
|---|---|---|
| 1980 | 2,040 | −9.1% |
| 1991 | 1,879 | −7.9% |
| 2001 | 1,985 | +5.6% |
| 2011 | 2,108 | +6.2% |
| 2021 | 2,238 | +6.2% |

Source: Censuses

== Economy ==
Velim is known for the Velim test centre, a railway rolling stock testing facility operated by VUZ (Railway Research Institute).

== Transport ==
Velim is located on the Prague–Kolín railway line.

== Sights ==
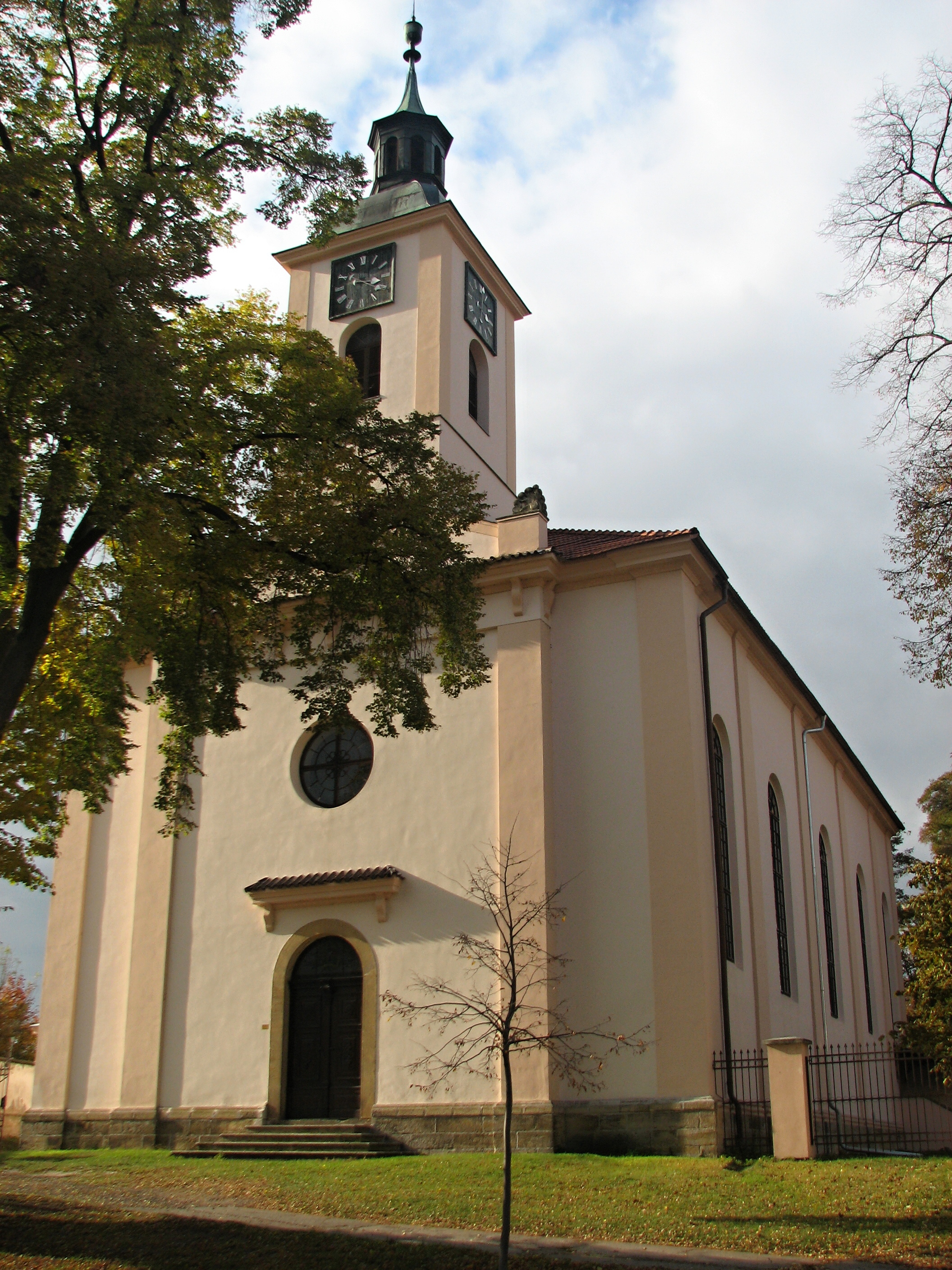
Evangelical church

The main landmarks of Velim are its two churches. The Church of Saint Lawrence was built in the Gothic style in the 13th century and rebuilt in the Baroque style in the mid-18th century. Next to the church is a separate bell tower, built in 1767.

The Evangelical church was built at the end of the 18th century and rebuilt into its current form in 1852.

== Notable people ==
- Stanislava Součková (1923–1997), opera singer
- Vladimír Karbusický (1925–2002), musicologist and folklorist
- Jaroslav Souček (1935–2006), opera singer
