= Laura Soucek =

- Born: Velletri
- Education: Sapienza University of Rome; University of California, San Francisco
- Scientific career
- Workplaces: Vall d'Hebron Institute of Oncology, ICREA, UAB

Laura Soucek (born 1973) is an Italian scientist. She is a Group Leader at VHIO (the Vall d'Hebron Institute of Oncology), Research Professor at ICREA, and CEO of Peptomyc S.L. She works on the Myc oncoprotein, the deregulation of which occurs during almost all cancers. Soucek has designed a dominant negative variant, Omomyc, which allows her to investigate the benefits of inhibiting Myc in cancer.

== Early life and education ==
Soucek was born in Velletri on the outskirts of Rome. She studied biology at the Sapienza University of Rome and graduated in 1996. During this time she started researching novel treatments for cancer. After earning her bachelor's degree, Soucek obtained a doctorate in genetics and molecular biology researching at the National Research Centre in Rome in 2001. That same year, she joined the University of California, San Francisco as a postdoctoral fellow. She was appointed as an Assistant Researcher in the laboratory of Gerard Evan in 2006. She returned to Europe in 2011, joining VHIO (Vall d'Hebron Institute of Oncology) as Principal Investigator of the Models of Cancer Therapies Laboratory.

== Research and career ==
Soucek is Head of the Models of Cancer Therapies Group at VHIO and was the first woman and non-Spanish national to be appointed as Principal Investigator at that Institution. She became research professor at ICREA in 2014. In 2014 she founded a spin-out company, Peptomyc S.L.. In 2015 she was made associate professor at the Autonomous University of Barcelona. Her research considers the Myc oncoprotein, a protein that cancer cells appear to depend on, which had long been considered too difficult to target. She has demonstrated that inhibition of Myc can have a dramatic therapeutic index in mouse models of cancer, causing minimal side effects in normal proliferating tissues. Soucek created Omomyc, a dominant negative form of Myc that can inhibit the oncogene without causing adverse impacts. As Omomyc is tolerated by mice and has anti-tumour activity, Soucek has been developing an efficient and safe drug version of it. She believes that inhibition of Myc can force the immune system to wake up, and kill cancer from the inside and outside. Peptomyc have demonstrated that Omomyc can be used against non-small-cell lung carcinoma and potentially be used for other oncological indications.

In 2019 Laura was awarded the European Institute of Innovation and Technology Public Prize. She featured in a FC Barcelona commercial to advertise the 2019/2020 season kit. The advert paid homage to people who have contributed to the community of Barcelona.

=== Selected publications ===
Her publications include:

- Soucek, Laura (2020). "Blocking Myc to Treat Cancer: Reflecting on Two Decades of Omomyc". Cells. 9 (4): 883. doi:10.3390/cells9040883. PMC 7226798. PMID 32260326.
- Soucek, Laura (2019). "Intrinsic cell-penetrating activity propels Omomyc from proof of concept to viable anti-MYC therapy". Science Translational Medicine. 11 (484) eaar5012. doi:10.1126/scitranslmed.aar5012. PMC 6522349. PMID 30894502.
- Soucek, Laura (2008). "Modelling Myc inhibition as a cancer therapy". Nature. 455 (7213): 679–683. Bibcode:2008Natur.455..679S. doi:10.1038/nature07260. PMC 4485609. PMID 18716624.
- Soucek, Laura (2007). "Mast cells are required for angiogenesis and macroscopic expansion of Myc-induced pancreatic islet tumors". Nature Medicine. 13 (10): 1211–1218. doi:10.1038/nm1649. PMID 17906636. S2CID 20816704.
- Soucek, Laura (2013). "Inhibition of Myc family proteins eradicates KRas-driven lung cancer in mice". Genes & Development. 27 (5): 504–513. doi:10.1101/gad.205542.112. PMC 3605464. PMID 23475959.
