= Sao Seng Suk =

Shan political leader

Sao Seng Suk (1935 – 13 August 2007), also known as Khun Kyar Nu, was a Shan political and military leader.

== Early life ==
He was the sixth son of Shan leader Khun Kyaw Pu, who signed the Panglong Agreement in 1947.

== Politician ==
In 1959, he joined the Noom Suk Harn and, in 1960, became the commander of the Shan State Army's Third Brigade.

He later became chairman and commander-in-chief of the Shan State Progress Party. He co-founded the Shan State Organization, and the Shan Democratic Union, and was elected as the first president of the Shan State Constitutional Drafting Commission before becoming involved with the Ethnic Nationalities Council.

== Death ==
He died in a hospital in Chiang Mai, Thailand on 13 August 2007, aged 72, from lung disease.

Sao Seng Suk was survived by his wife, Nang Layen, three sons, and a daughter.

== Sources ==
Democratic Voice of Burma interview with U Shwe Ohn, who was involved in the Pang Long agreement.
