= Jaroslav Souček =

Czech opera singer (1935–2006)

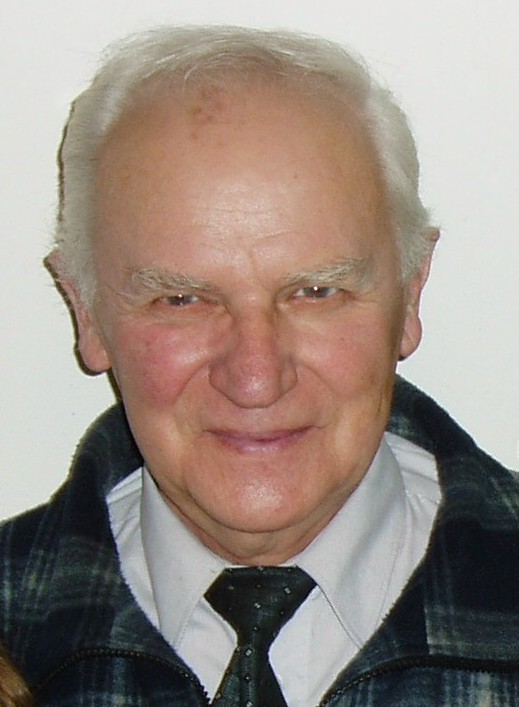
Jaroslav Souček (2005)

Jaroslav Souček (8 December 1935 – 2 January 2006) was a Czech operatic baritone who had an active career in his native country from 1960 through 1997. He sang a broad repertoire that encompassed roles from Czech, English, French, German, Italian, and Russian operas from a variety of musical periods. He was also active as a concert singer and performed numerous times with the Czech Philharmonic. His voice is preserved on a number of Czech radio broadcasts and CD and DVD recordings made on the Supraphon label.

== Biography ==
Born in Velim, Souček studied singing with Konstantin Karenin at the Prague Conservatory. He made his professional opera debut in 1960 at the Jihočeské divadlo in České Budějovice where he remained for the first two years of his career, sometimes sharing the stage with his sister, soprano Stanislava Součková. He made a guest appearance at the Komische Oper Berlin in the Fall of 1962 before becoming a member of the Brno National Theatre where he was committed from 1963-1979, and where he created the role of Artur de St Barbe (Juste) in the premiere of Les trois souhaits, ou Les vicissitudes de le vie, (Tři přání) by Bohuslav Martinů.

In 1979 Souček became a principal artist at the Prague National Theatre. He remained at this house until his retirement from the stage in 1997. His repertoire in Prague encompassed more than 50 roles, including Bohuš in Antonín Dvořák's The Jacobin, Count Almaviva in Wolfgang Amadeus Mozart's The Marriage of Figaro, Dr Malatesta in Gaetano Donizetti's Don Pasquale, Dr Schön in Alban Berg's Lulu, Figaro in Gioachino Rossini's The Barber of Seville, Fotis in Bohuslav Martinů's The Greek Passion, Germont in Giuseppe Verdi's La traviata, Golaud in Claude Debussy's Pelléas et Mélisande, Harašta in Leoš Janáček's The Cunning Little Vixen, Kalina in Bedřich Smetana's The Secret, Lord Vok in Smetana's The Devil's Wall, Porgy in George Gershwin's Porgy and Bess, Přemysl in Smetana's Libuše, Prince Yeletsky in Pyotr Ilyich Tchaikovsky's The Queen of Spades, Scarpia in Giacomo Puccini's Tosca, Tomeš in Smetana's The Kiss, Vladislav in Smetana's Dalibor, and the title roles in Alexander Borodin's Prince Igor, Verdi's Rigoletto and Verdi's Falstaff.

Although he no longer appeared in operas after 1997, Souček continued to perform in concert until 2002. Throughout his career Souček was active as a voice teacher, notably serving on the faculties of both the České Budějovice Conservatory and the Academy of Performing Arts in Prague. He continued to teach at the latter institution up until his death in 2006 in Prague at the age of 70.
