= Stanislava Součková =

Czech opera singer

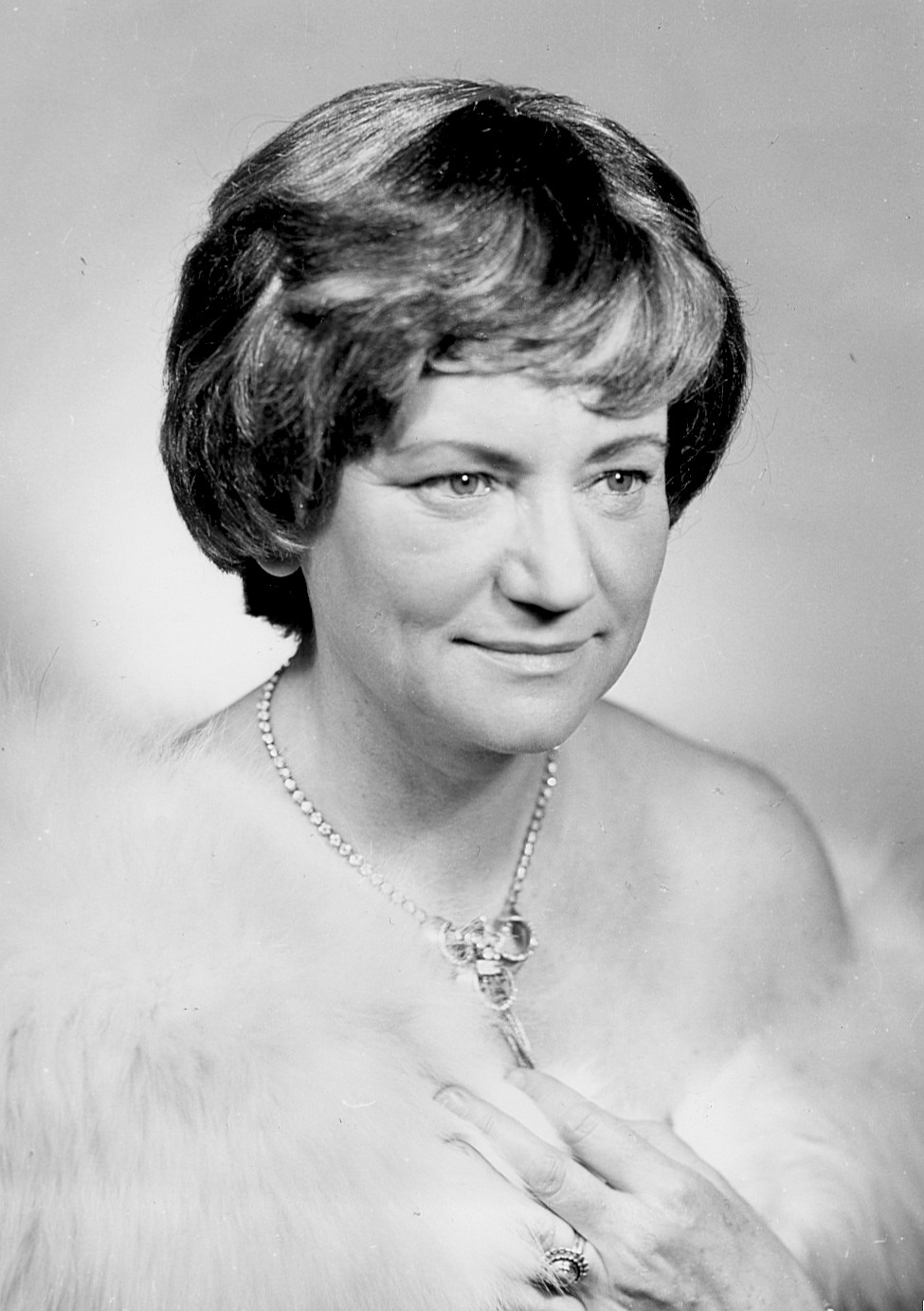
Stanislava Součková (1972)

Stanislava Součková (27 November 1923 in Velim – 23 July 1997 in České Budějovice) was a Czech operatic soprano and the sister of baritone Jaroslav Souček. Between 1951 and 1961, she was a member of the principal artists at the Hudební divadlo Karlín where she appeared in leading roles in operettas. In 1961 she joined the Jihočeské divadlo in České Budějovice where she remained until her retirement in 1974. She also was a frequent guest artist at the National Theatre in Prague. After her retirement, she embarked on a second career as a voice teacher on the faculty of the University of South Bohemia in the Czech Budejovice.

== Opera roles ==
- Ludwig van Beethoven – Fidelio (Leonora)
- Georges Bizet – Carmen (Micaela)
- Gaetano Donizetti – Don Pasquale (Norina)
- Antonín Dvořák – Rusalka (Rusalka), The Jacobin (Julie)
- George Gershwin – Porgy and Bess (Serena)
- Leoš Janáček – Káťa Kabanová (Káťa)
- Bohuslav Martinů – Miracle of Our Lady (Mariken)
- W. A. Mozart – The Magic Flute (The Queen of the Night), Don Giovanni (Zerlina), Cosi fan tutte (Fiordiligi), Die Entführung aus dem Serail (Konstanza)
- Giacomo Puccini – Madama Butterfly (Cio-Cio-san)
- Nikolai Rimsky-Korsakov – The Golden Cockerel (Shemakhan Tsaritsa)
- Gioacchino Rossini – The Barber of Seville (Rosina)
- Bedřich Smetana – The Kiss (Barče), The Bartered Bride (Mařenka), Libuše (Libuše), The Two Widows (Karolina)
- Eugen Suchoň – Krútňava (Katrena)
- Giuseppe Verdi – La traviata (Violeta), Rigoletto (Gilda), Il trovatore (Leonora), Don Carlos (Elizabetta), Un ballo in maschera (Amelia)

== Sources ==
- Dagmar Blümlová: Stanislava Součková – život operní pěvkyně“ (Pelhřimov 2001)
