= Ratenice =

- Municipality
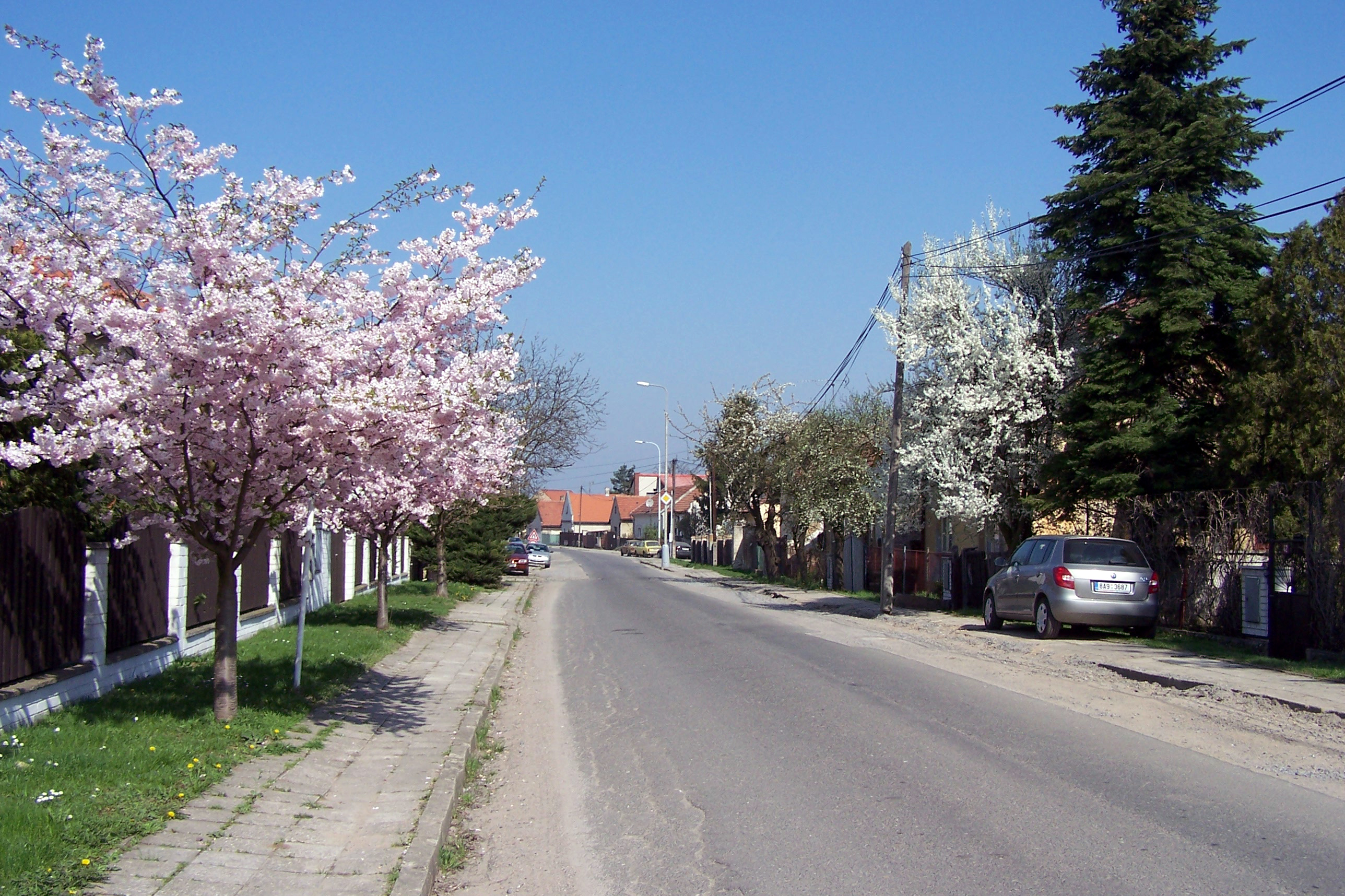
- Main street

- Flag Coat of arms

- Location in the Czech Republic
- Coordinates: 50°5′30″N 15°3′34″E
- Country: Czech Republic
- Region: Central Bohemian
- District: Kolín
- First mentioned: 1340

Area
  - Total: 4.73 km^{2} (1.83 sq mi)
- Elevation: 196 m (643 ft)

Population (2026-01-01)
  - Total: 682
  - Density: 144/km^{2} (373/sq mi)
- Time zone: UTC+1 (CET)
  - Summer (DST): UTC+2 (CEST)
- Postal code: 289 11
- Website: www.ratenice.cz

Ratenice is a municipality and village in Kolín District in the Central Bohemian Region of the Czech Republic. It has about 700 inhabitants. It is located in the Polabí lowland.

== Demographics ==
Historical population
Year	Pop.	±%
1869	546	—
1880	622	+13.9%
1890	741	+19.1%
1900	676	−8.8%
1910	800	+18.3%
1921	828	+3.5%
1930	899	+8.6%
1950	692	−23.0%
1961	680	−1.7%
1970	597	−12.2%
1980	484	−18.9%
1991	411	−15.1%
2001	476	+15.8%
2011	562	+18.1%
2021	638	+13.5%
Source: Censuses
