= Pop =

Pop or POP may refer to:

== Arts, entertainment, and media ==
=== Music ===
==== Albums and EPs ====
- Pop (Fanatic Crisis album), 2021
- Pop (Gas album)
- Pop (Joachim Witt album)
- Pop (Mao Abe album)
- Pop (Same Difference album)
- Pop (Tones on Tail album)
- Pop (U2 album)
- Pop, an album by Topi Sorsakoski and Agents
- P.O.P, The Mad Capsule Markets album
- Pop! The First 20 Hits, an album by English duo Erasure
- P.O.P. (EP), by Marina Satti

==== Music groups ====
- Project Pop, an Indonesian pop group
- POP, a Japanese idol group now known as Gang Parade
- Pop! (British group)
- Pop! featuring Angie Hart, an Australian band

==== Songs ====
- "Pop" (NSYNC song), 2001
- "Pop!" (Nayeon song), 2022
- "Pop", by A.R. Kane
- "Pop", by Ari Lennox from Shea Butter Baby
- "Pop", by La Oreja de Van Gogh from El viaje de Copperpot
- "Pop", by Death Grips from No Love Deep Web
- "Pop!", from The Wedding Singer musical
- "Pop", by Harry Styles from Kiss All the Time. Disco, Occasionally
- "Pop", by Illit from Break Even
- "P.O.P", by Denzel Curry from King of the Mischievous South Vol. 2

==== Other uses in music ====
- Pop music, a musical genre

=== Periodicals ===
- Pop (fashion magazine), a British publication
- Pop Magazine, a sports magazine

=== Television ===
- Pop (American TV channel), formerly TVGN
- Pop (British and Irish TV channel), for children
- Pop (Slovenian TV channel), Slovenia
- Pop (Pakistani TV channel), for children
- Pop (Italy), for children
- "Pop" (The Bear), a 2023 episode of The Bear TV series

=== Toys ===
- POP! vinyl figurines from Funko
- Princess of Power, Mattel toys

=== Video games ===
- Prince of Persia, franchise
- Pop (video game)

=== Other uses in arts, entertainment, and media ===
- PoP!, the fictional band in Music and Lyrics
- Pokémon Organized Play, trading cards
- Pop Harukaze, a.k.a. Caitlyn Goodwyn, a fictional character from the anime/manga series Ojamajo Doremi
- Pacific Ocean Park, an amusement park

== Commerce ==
- Pop, slang for pawning goods with a pawnbroker
- Pay on production
- Point of purchase, used often in retail
- Proof of principle
- Proof-of-payment, a fare collection approach

== Organizations ==
- Eton Society, nickname
- Pencils of Promise, a charity
- Pop, a US company owned by Advance Publications Inc.
- POP Bank Group, a banking group in Finland

== Places ==
- Gregorio Luperón International Airport (IATA code POP), Puerto Plata, Dominican Republic
- Pop, a tributary of the river Jijia in eastern Romania
- Pop, Uzbekistan, a town in Namangan Region, Uzbekistan
- Poppleton railway station (station code), York, England

== People ==
- Pop (nickname)
- Pop (surname), a Romanian surname
- Pop Chalee (1906–1993), American painter, muralist, performer and singer born Merina Lujan
- Iggy Pop (born 1947), American musician
- Jimmy Pop (born 1972), American musician
- Lizi Pop (born 2004), Musical Georgian singer, actress, model, dancer and television presenter
- Pop Smoke (1999–2020), American rapper

== Science and technology ==
=== Biology and medicine ===
- Paroxypropione, P.O.P.
- Progestogen-only pill, a contraceptive
- Pelvic organ prolapse, a gynecological condition

=== Computing ===
- Operation removing element from a stack (abstract data type)
- Package on package, IC packaging
- Point of presence, a demarcation point between communicating entities
- POP and POP3, Internet e-mail Post Office Protocols
- POP-1 POP-2 POP-11, programming languages
- Pop! OS, a Linux distribution

=== Earth science ===
- Parallel Ocean Program, an ocean circulation model
- Persistent organic pollutant
- Probability of precipitation, in weather forecasting

=== Other uses in science and technology ===
- Pop (physics), sixth derivative of position
- Blind rivet
- Plaster of Paris, plaster made from dehydrated gypsum
- Pop, a recording noise from plosives; see pop filter

== Sport ==
- Pop (professional wrestling), a crowd cheer
- POP Championship (Princess of Pro-Wrestling), Japan

== Other uses ==
- POP (Point of Purchase typeface), in Japanese Kanji
- Pop (ghost), in Thai folklore
- Pop (train)
- The first month of the Haabʼ in the Mayan calendar
- Problem-oriented policing
- Pop, a truncation of the word popular, e.g., popular culture → pop culture
- Pop, strike with a paddle during school corporal punishment in the United States
- Soft drink
- Father, or occasionally grandfather
- Population (disambiguation), often abbreviated pop.
- Pop Mie, an instant cup noodle brand which is a sub-brand of Indomie, first introduced in Indonesia in 1991

== See also ==
- Popping (disambiguation)
- Pops (disambiguation)
- "Pop! Goes the Weasel", 19th century song
