= List of states by population =

List of states by population may refer to:

- List of countries and dependencies by population
- List of U.S. states and territories by population
- List of states and union territories of India by population

== See also ==
- Population (disambiguation)
