= IC5 =

Danish electric multiple unit train class

DSB Class ES (IC5)
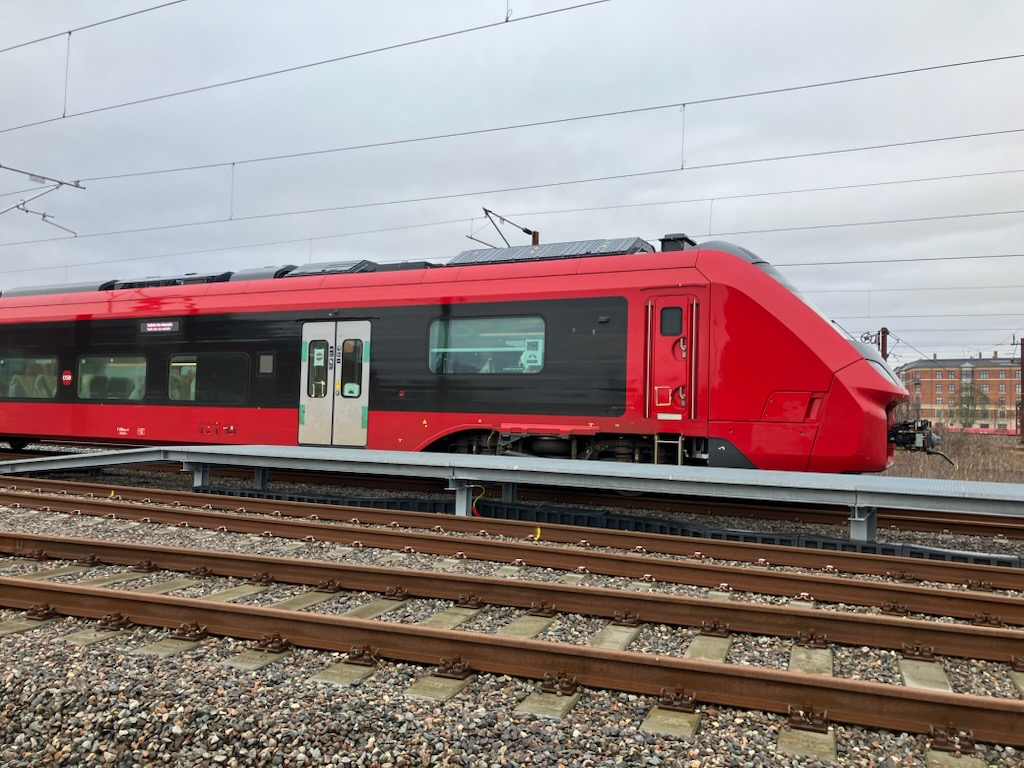
- IC5 at the Copenhagen maintenance depot in 2026
- Stock type: Electric multiple unit
- Manufacturer: Alstom
- Assembly: Katowice, Poland; Salzgitter, Germany
- Family name: Coradia Stream
- Replaced: IC3 (Class MF); IC4 (Class MG); IR4; Class ET (Øresundståg)
- Constructed: 2023 –
- Entered service: 2027 (planned)
- Number under construction: 153
- Formation: 5 cars
- Capacity: 300 seats

Specifications
- Train length: 109.4 m (358 ft 11 in)
- Width: 2,820 mm (9 ft 3 in)
- Height: 4,265 mm (13 ft 11.9 in)
- Floor height: 620 mm (2 ft 0 in)
- Doors: 5 per side
- Wheel diameter: 920–840 mm (36–33 in) (new–worn)
- Maximum speed: 200 km/h (125 mph)
- Traction motors: 8
- Power output: 7,950 hp (5,930 kW)
- Acceleration: 1.2 m/s^{2} (3.9 ft/s^{2}) from 0-70 km/h (43 mph)
- Electric system: 25 kV 50 Hz AC (nominal) from overhead catenary
- Current collection: Pantograph
- UIC classification: Bo′(2)′(2)′Bo′+Bo′(2)′Bo′
- Safety systems: ETCS BL 3, STM ZUB123
- Track gauge: 1,435 mm (4 ft 8 1/2 in) standard gauge

The DSB Class ES is a planned electric multiple unit train class ordered by the Danish State Railways (DSB). The trains are branded as IC5 and are part of Alstom's Coradia Stream family. The trainsets are being built by Alstom in Poland and Germany.

The class is intended to replace several older DSB train types, including the IC3, IC4, IR4 and Class ET Øresundståg trainsets, supporting DSB's transition from diesel-powered rolling stock to a fully electric fleet and aligning with ongoing electrification of Denmark's railway network.

== History ==
On 12 April 2021, DSB announced that it would be acquiring 100 trains from Alstom. The investment was worth €2.6 billion and included 15 years of maintenance. This formed the largest investment in DSB's history, exceeding 20 billion Danish kroner for procurement and maintenance.

On 12 May 2021, Stadler Rail filed a complaint against the contract award. The contract was signed in June 2021.

The IC5 name was announced in April 2022. In 2022, entry into service was delayed from December 2024 to mid-2025, citing design modifications and supply chain considerations. A full-scale mock-up was unveiled in Copenhagen on 11 May 2023.

In November 2023, DSB further delayed entry into passenger service to 2027, attributing the revised schedule to finalizing the design, meeting DSB's quality, comfort, and reliability requirements, and adjusting production planning and supply chains.

Testing began at Velim in the Czech Republic on 1 September 2024, where test trains reached 200 km/h (120 mph).

The IC5 received the Red Dot Design Award in June 2024.

In June 2025, DSB ordered 50 additional trainsets. Although the additional order was for 50 trainsets, DSB later listed the combined IC5 order as 153 trainsets.

The first IC5 trainset arrived in Denmark in September 2025 and was publicly presented the same month.

By late 2025, testing in Denmark was being carried out on selected lines, while six other IC5 trainsets continued test running elsewhere in Europe. Series production began in February 2026, and driver instructor training began in January 2026 using full-scale and onboard simulators.

== Design and features ==
The IC5 uses a different bodyshell compared to other Coradia Stream units, such as NS' ICNG and Trenitalia's Pop trains. It is the third cab design used for the Coradia Stream platform.

The livery is similar to that of DSB's other trains. It uses a red bodyshell, with the sides and cab cars using a black mask-like design. To comply with TSI visibility regulations, the exterior doors are light gray, while the interior door surfaces are red.

Each five car trainset is 109.4 m (359 ft) long and has a maximum speed of 200 km/h (120 mph). Each trainset has 300 seats, two wheelchair spaces, 12 bicycle spaces, three toilets, level boarding for passengers with reduced mobility, and a power output of 7,950 hp (5,930 kW).

The seating areas include luggage racks, armrests, coat hooks, individual power outlets, and tables. Flex areas accommodate bicycles, prams, and bulky luggage, with folding seats for flexible use of the space. The catering area includes vending machines and a bar table, adjacent to the wheelchair spaces and accessible toilet.

== Maintenance ==
Dedicated facilities are being established for the new electric fleet. The Copenhagen workshop at Godsbanegården opened in 2025. It covers 10,651 m^{2} (114,650 sq ft) with four IC5 maintenance tracks, a wheel lathe track, and administration and storage facilities at a cost of 736 million DKK, and was pre-certified for DGNB Gold sustainability standards. The Aarhus workshop in Logistikparken, Brabrand, was planned at a cost of 1.3 billion DKK, it opened with eight maintenance tracks at a cost of 2.3 billion DKK in 2026.

== Gallery ==
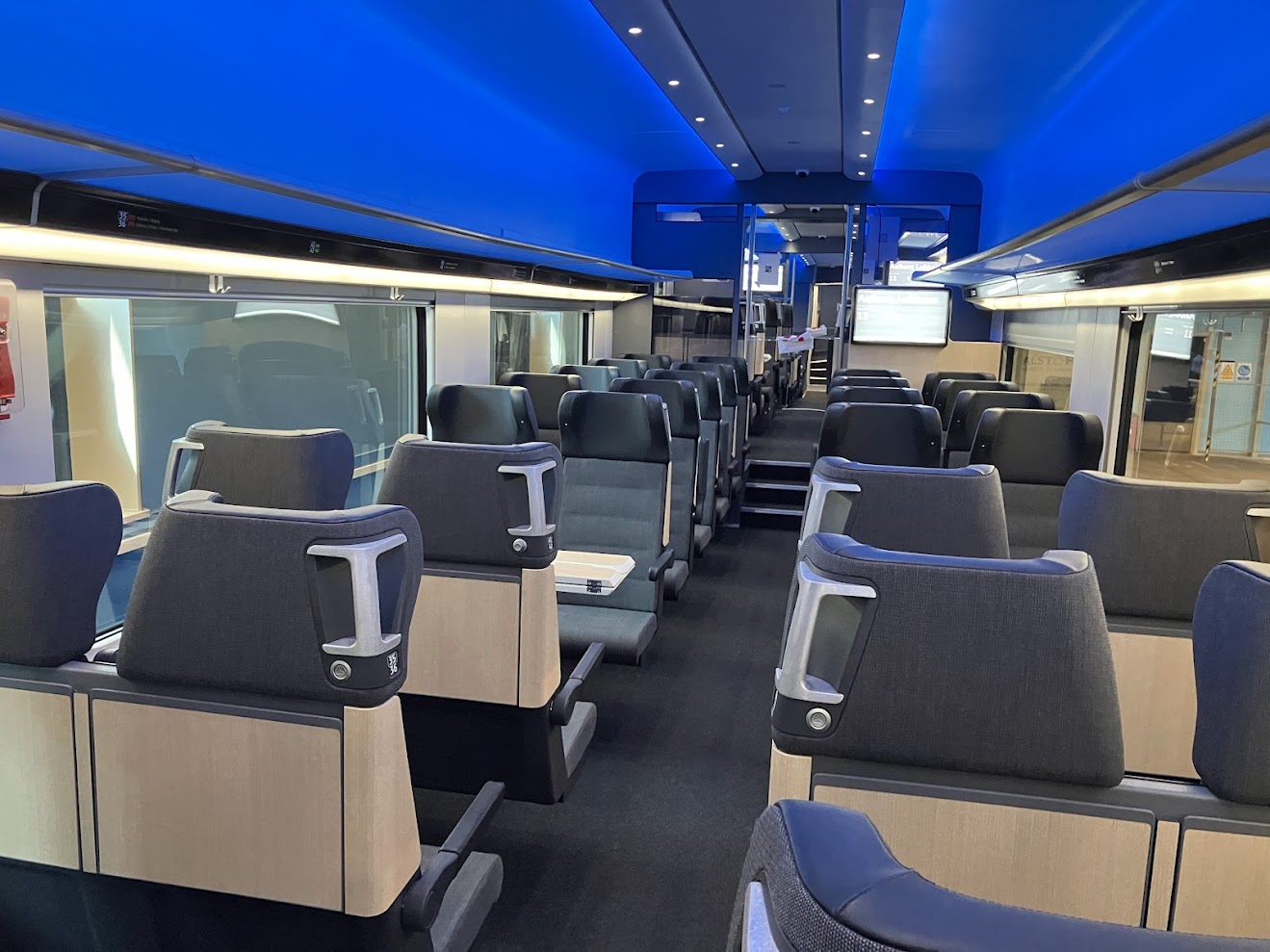
Mock-up of the interior

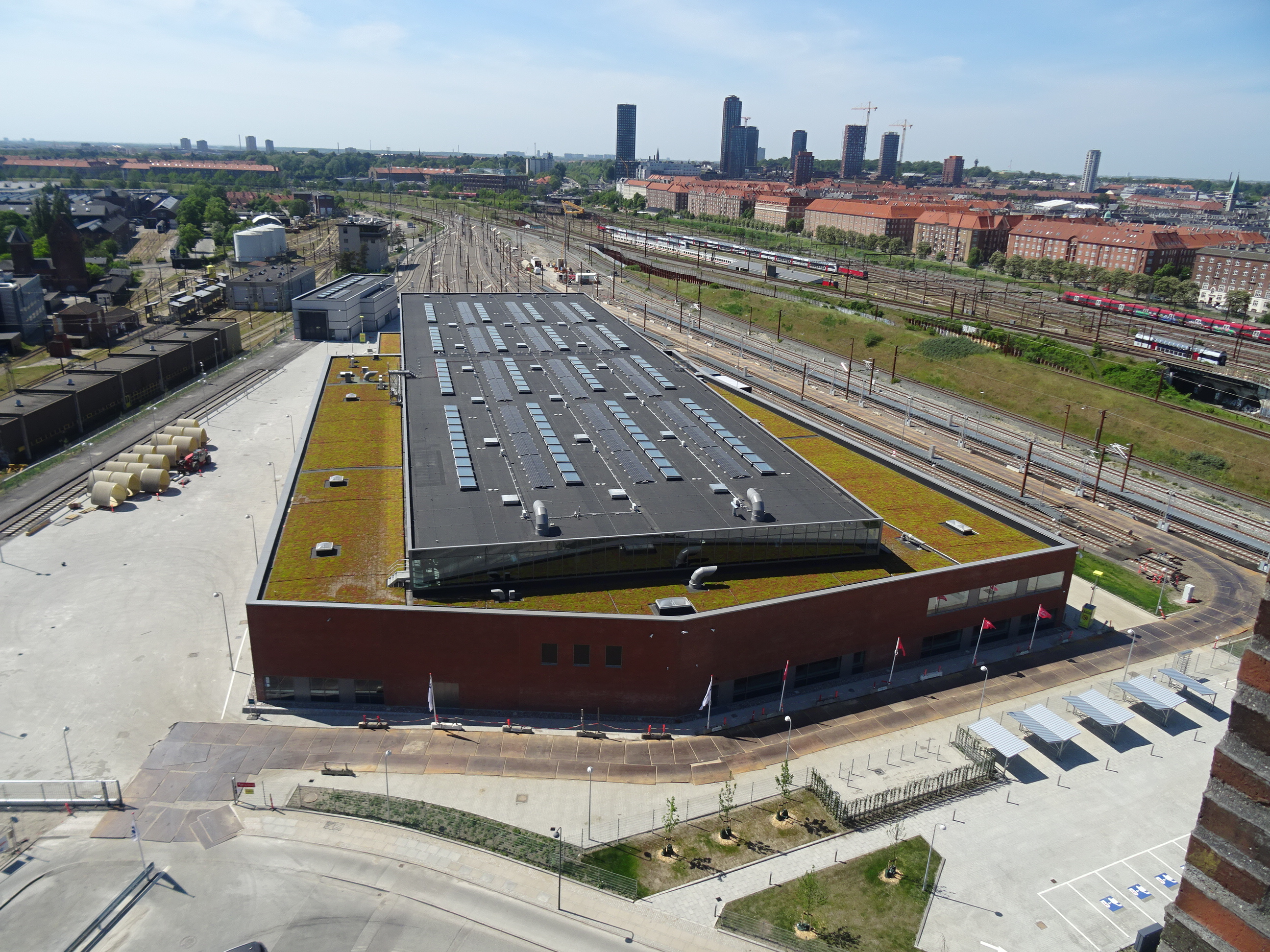
View from Traffic Tower East of Copenhagen IC5 workshop

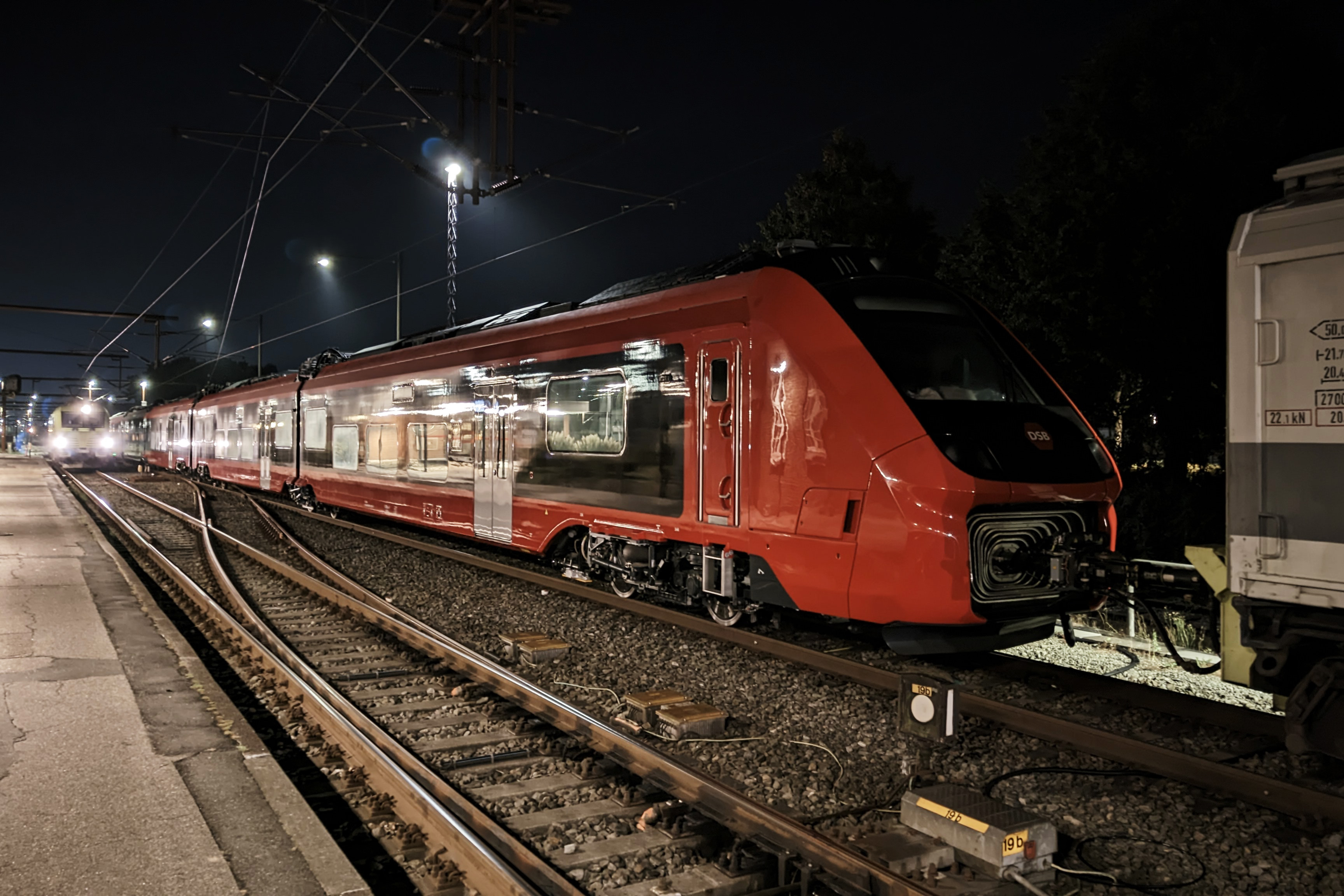
IC5 passing Padborg station

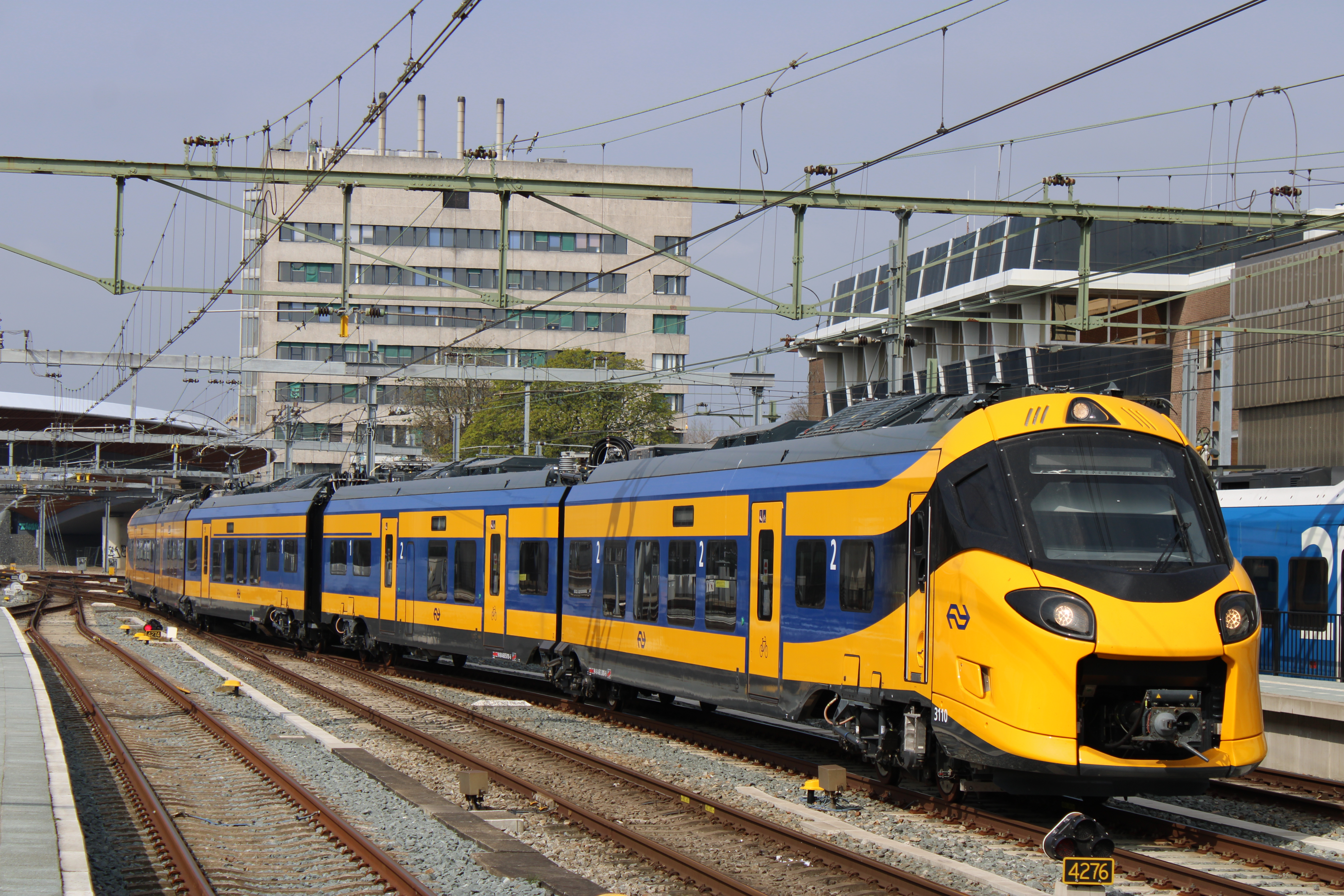
Dutch ICNG Coradia Stream train, similar to the Danish IC5
