= Alstom Coradia =

Family of diesel and electric multiple units

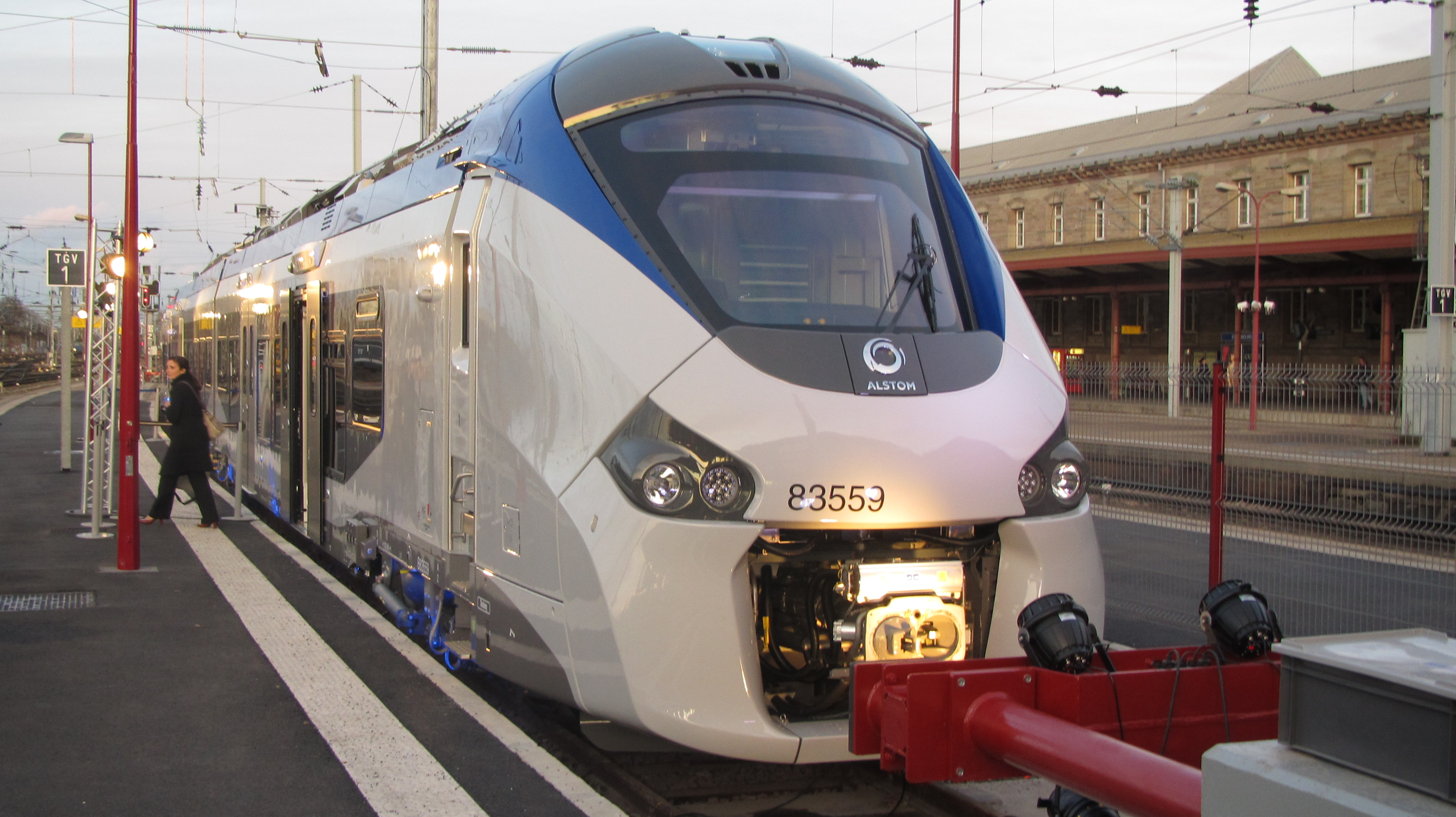
- A Coradia Polyvalent train built by Alstom.
- Manufacturer: Alstom

Specifications
- Prime mover: 4 6 MAN D2676LE62X
- Track gauge: 1,435 mm (4 ft 8 1/2 in) standard gauge

The Alstom Coradia is a family of diesel multiple units, electric multiple units, and unpowered coaches for intercity and regional service manufactured by Alstom, with variants operating in Europe, North America, and Africa.

== Design ==
The Coradia is a family of high-performance rolling stock, manufactured by Alstom Transport and offered in various configurations to suit the varying requirements of operators. It is available in both diesel multiple unit (DMU) and an electric multiple unit (EMU) configurations; a high-density double-decker model, the Coradia Duplex, has also been developed. The Coradia uses Alstom's own Onix IGBT traction system, which is promoted as providing smooth acceleration and energy conservation facilities. The standard variants of the train are fitted with a regenerative braking system. The Coradia can also be equipped with a variety of communication and signalling systems, including national automatic train protection (ATP) and European Train Control System (ETCS).

The Coradia is designed to offer a high degree of comfort for passengers. The design of the interior incorporates a modular philosophy; as standard, the passenger compartment features ambient lighting, luggage racks and storage areas, as well as partition walls located between the foyer and the seating areas. Each seat can be equipped with electrical sockets, individual lighting, and various audio and video systems; both the pitch and configuration of the seats are customisable to meet the operator's requirements. The internal fittings can be easily redistributed, being typically mounted onto purpose-built slots. Amongst the options available for customisation are equipment such as vending machines, in-train ticketing dispensers, and built-in internet provision; specialised accessibility facilities for disabled passengers can also be installed.

=== Coradia range ===
The Coradia range of regional trains includes the Coradia Duplex, Coradia Lint, Coradia Continental, Coradia Polyvalent and Coradia Nordic variants. Alstom has also developed the Coradia Meridian, specifically for Trenitalia and other regional operators in Italy. The Coradia Continental is an EMU operated as either three, four, five or six-carriage sets; up to four train-sets can be joined during peak times. The traction system is roof-mounted, freeing up room for a more spacious interior. Developed for German and other European markets, the Continental complies with the International Union of Railways (UIC) loading gauge standard and is suitable for platform heights of 550–760 mm (22–30 in).

The Coradia Duplex train is a double-decker EMU operated in two to seven-carriage sets; furthermore, up to four train sets may be coupled together for a maximum length of 12 carriages. The Duplex range includes two models, one developed and used for TER services in France (designated Class Z 26500) as well as by Chemins de Fer Luxembourgeois (designated CFL 2200), while the other is used in Sweden.

The Coradia Nordic is a wider body train, specifically developed for the large gauge standard commonly used in Northern Europe, and is available in configurations of four, five or six-carriage EMUs. To enable its use during the harsh winters common to Scandinavia, it can be operated at temperatures as low as −35 °C (−31 °F) and stored at temperatures as low as −40 °C (−40 °F). To create space for passenger amenities and seating, its traction equipment is mounted on the roof.

The Coradia LINT, originally designed by Linke-Hofmann-Busch before its acquisition by Alstom, is a diesel-powered light train, somewhat similar to the Siemens Desiro and Bombardier Talent. It is available in configurations of one, two, and three-carriage sets; up to three such trainsets can be attached together. The propulsion system of the LINT features a diesel powerpack mounted to the underframe of the carriage to maximise space in the low-floor section. The design reportedly complies with the latest European environmental standards. It is used by a number of railways in Germany (DB class 640 and 648), the Netherlands, and Denmark.

The Coradia Polyvalent is a platform of train now produced by CAF. It can operate at a maximum speed of 160 km/h (99 mph) in electric or bi-mode at voltages of 25 kV and 1.5 kV; a cross-border version capable of operating at a voltage of 15 kV, suitable for the German and Swiss rail networks, is also available. The low integrated floor of the carriages provides improved accessibility and a high level of visibility to passengers. To restrict vibrations and noise levels, motorised bogies are placed at both ends of each carriage.

The Coradia Stream is the latest variant in the Coradia family. It is a low-floor EMU that can go up to 200 km/h (120 mph) in its intercity configuration. First ordered by Trenitalia in 2016 in a regional trains configuration that goes up to 160 km/h (99 mph) under the name Pop. NS was the first company to order the Intercity version for their Intercity Nieuwe Generatie..

The Coradia MAX is the double decker variant of Coradia Stream. five-car and three-car units were sold to DB Regio AG for use originally in-between Hamburg and Rostock/Lübeck. CFL has also ordered a number (6 as of March 2026) as the 2400 Series. As of November 2026, significant technical issues have been discovered, which have caused production to be halted while revisions are carried out. No units are expected to be delivered before March 2028.

== Operators ==
=== Europe ===
==== Bulgaria ====
In April 2025, Bulgaria's Ministry of Transport and Communications placed an order for 35 electric Coradia Stream interregional trains plus 15 years of maintenance services. The trains will be operated by BDŽ. A test trainset began test runs across the country's rail network in December 2025, while deliveries of operational trains are expected to begin in August 2026. First two trainsets came into service between Plovdiv and Svilengrad on 1. September 2026.

==== Denmark ====
Alstom Coradia LINT diesel units are used in local trains.

In June 2021, Alstom announced that it had won Denmark's biggest-ever railway contract, with a total contract value of €2.6 billion. The first firm order, which includes a 30-year full-service maintenance agreement, was placed by the Danish state-owned DSB for 100 Coradia Stream IC5 electric trains, and is valued at €1.4 billion; DSB expects to buy a total of 153. Delivery was originally planned to start in 2024, but was delayed to 2027, due to delays in final design and supply chain issues. Trains will consist of 5 cars with 300 seats, and are being built at Katowice, Poland, and Saltzgitter, Germany.

==== Finland ====
The VR Class Sm4 is used for regional traffic from Helsinki to Hanko, Lahti, Riihimäki, Tampere and Kouvola.

==== France ====
During October 2009, Alstom received an €800 million ($1.2 billion) order for 100 Coradia Polyvalents from French national railway operator SNCF; a €130 million option for 19 more trains was exercised in January 2010. During March 2010, the company was awarded a follow-on €135 million contract for an additional 23 Coradia Polyvalents from SNCF. In May 2014, the Régiolis train was introduced by the ARF (Association of French Regions), SNCF and Alstom at the Vaugirard station in Paris. As many as 182 Régiolis trains have been ordered by 12 French Regions. SNCF ordered 14 hydrogen trains in 2021.

The CDG Express will also use Coradia Liner trains.

==== Germany ====
The Coradia Continental is in operation with several operators in Germany. It was introduced in 2002, and has been ordered by Hamburger Hochbahn (for agilis), DB Regio, Metronom and Hessische Landesbahn (HLB). In December 2020 S-Bahn Nuremberg switched their lines S1 and the new S5 (previously the Allersberg Express) over to the Coradia Continental. On S5 the trains had to be equipped with ETCS due to using the Nuremberg Ingolstadt high speed line.

The Coradia LINT is also operated, known by the local designations of DB class 640 and DB class 648. During May 2013, private operator AKN Eisenbahn ordered 14 Coradia Lints worth approximately €60 million. In May 2014, Alstom delivered the first of 24 modernised Lints to Germany's Lower Saxony State public transit authority Landesnahverkehrsgesellschaft Niedersachsen (LNVG). In April 2014, the company agreed to supply six new Coradia Lints to LNVG; that same month, a €150 million contract for 29 Coradia Continental electrical trains was signed by Verkehrsverbund Mittelsachsen (VMS) in Central Saxony, Germany.

During December 2015, Hessische Landesbahn placed a €160 million contract for 30 Coradia Continental EMUs, these are intended to be run on the Südhessen-Untermain network. In March 2016, Transdev placed an order for 28 Coradia Lints for operation in Augsburg, Germany. DB Regio placed a €40 million order for eight Lints in April 2016.

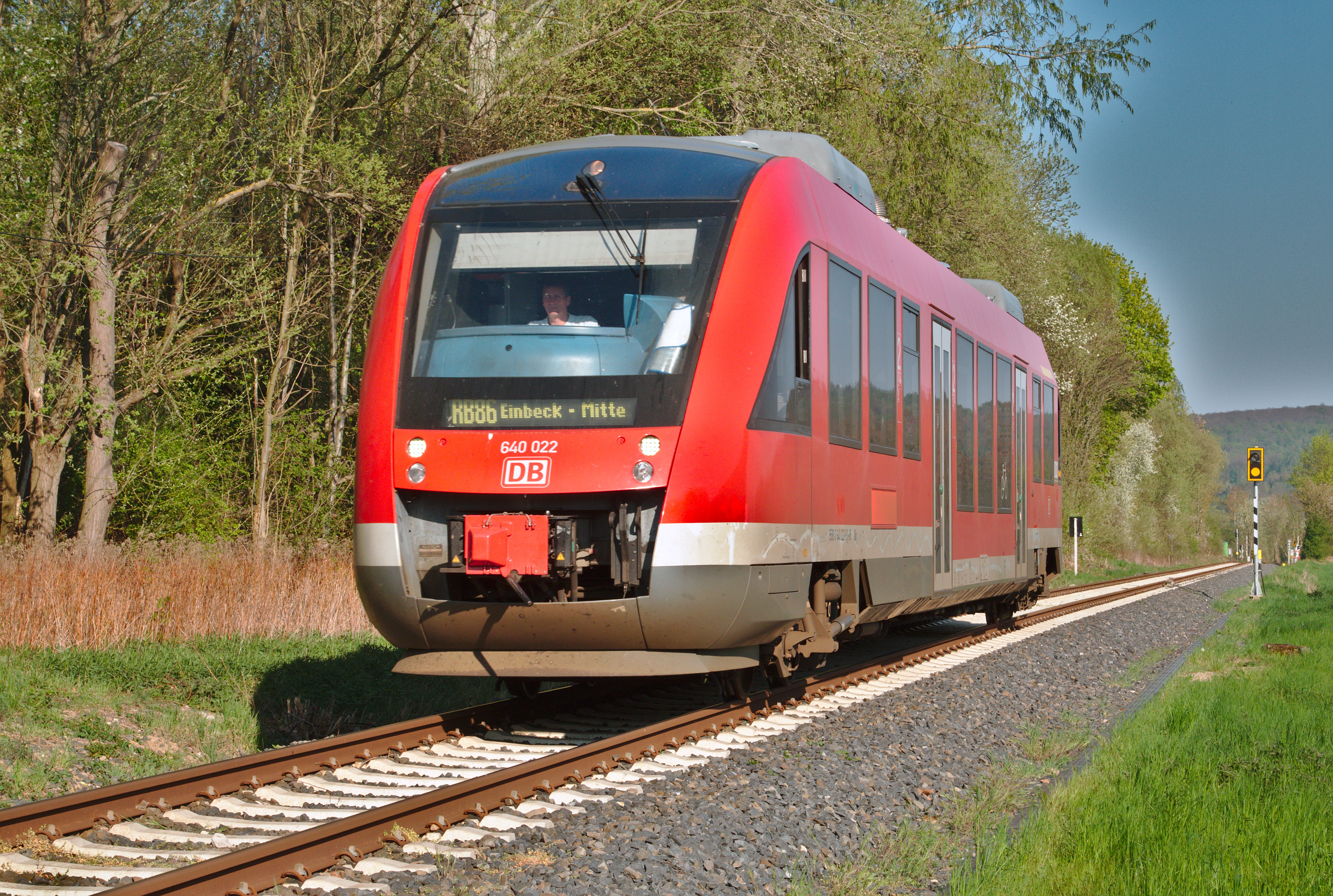
LINT 27 of Deutsche Bahn

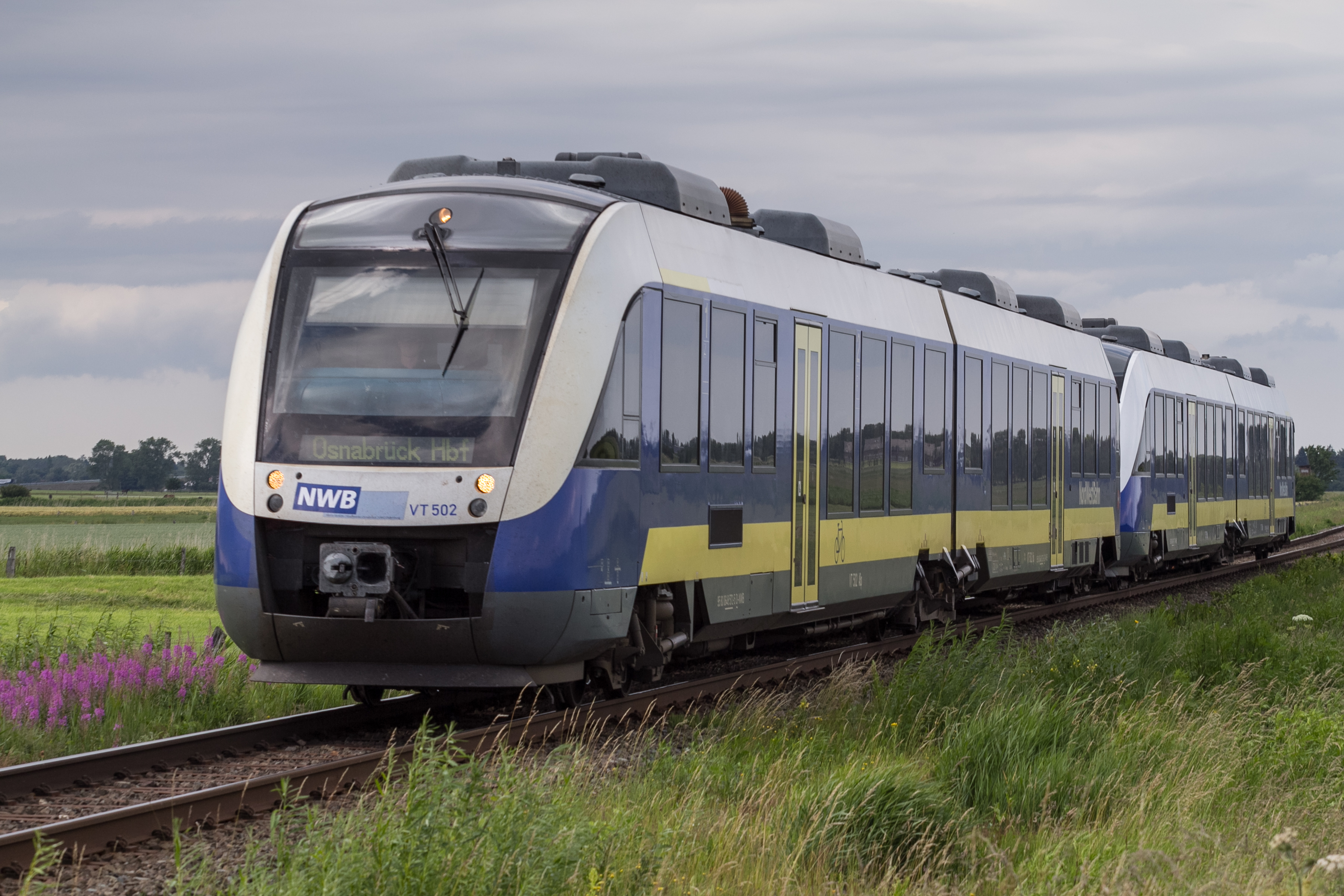
LINT 41 of NordWestBahn

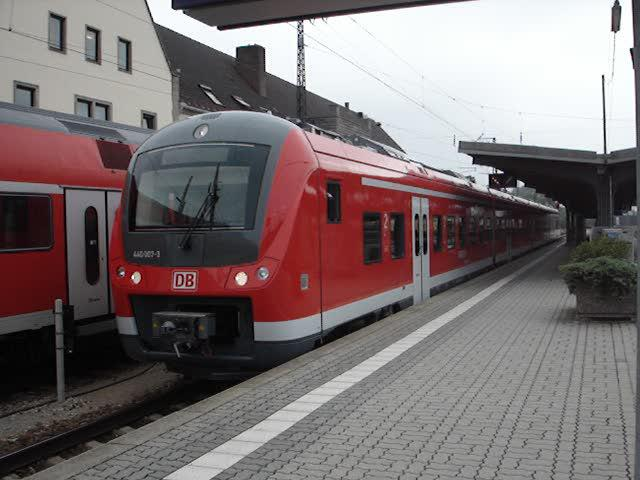
Coradia Continental (Class 440) of Deutsche Bahn

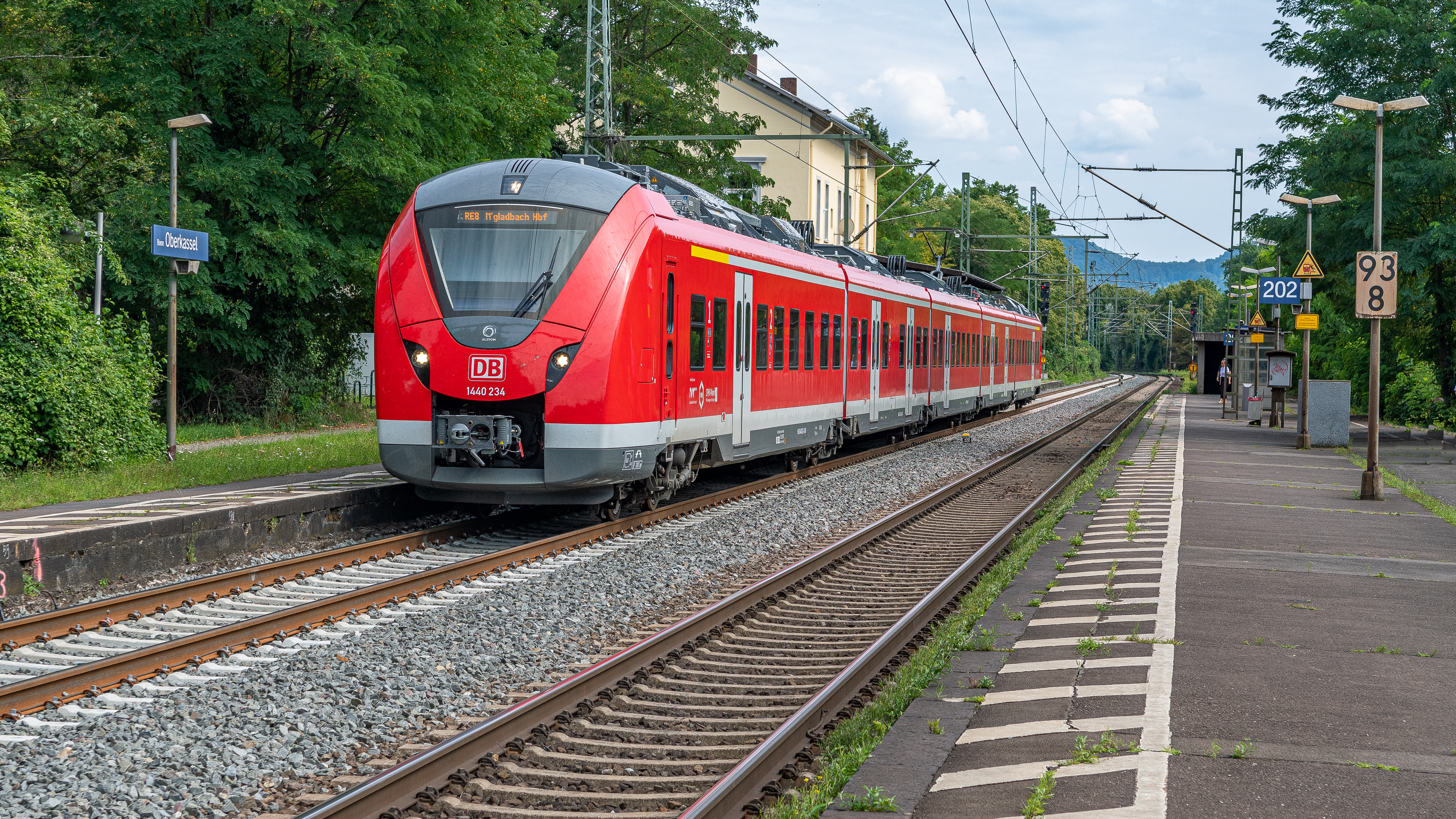
Coradia Continental (Class 1440) of Deutsche Bahn

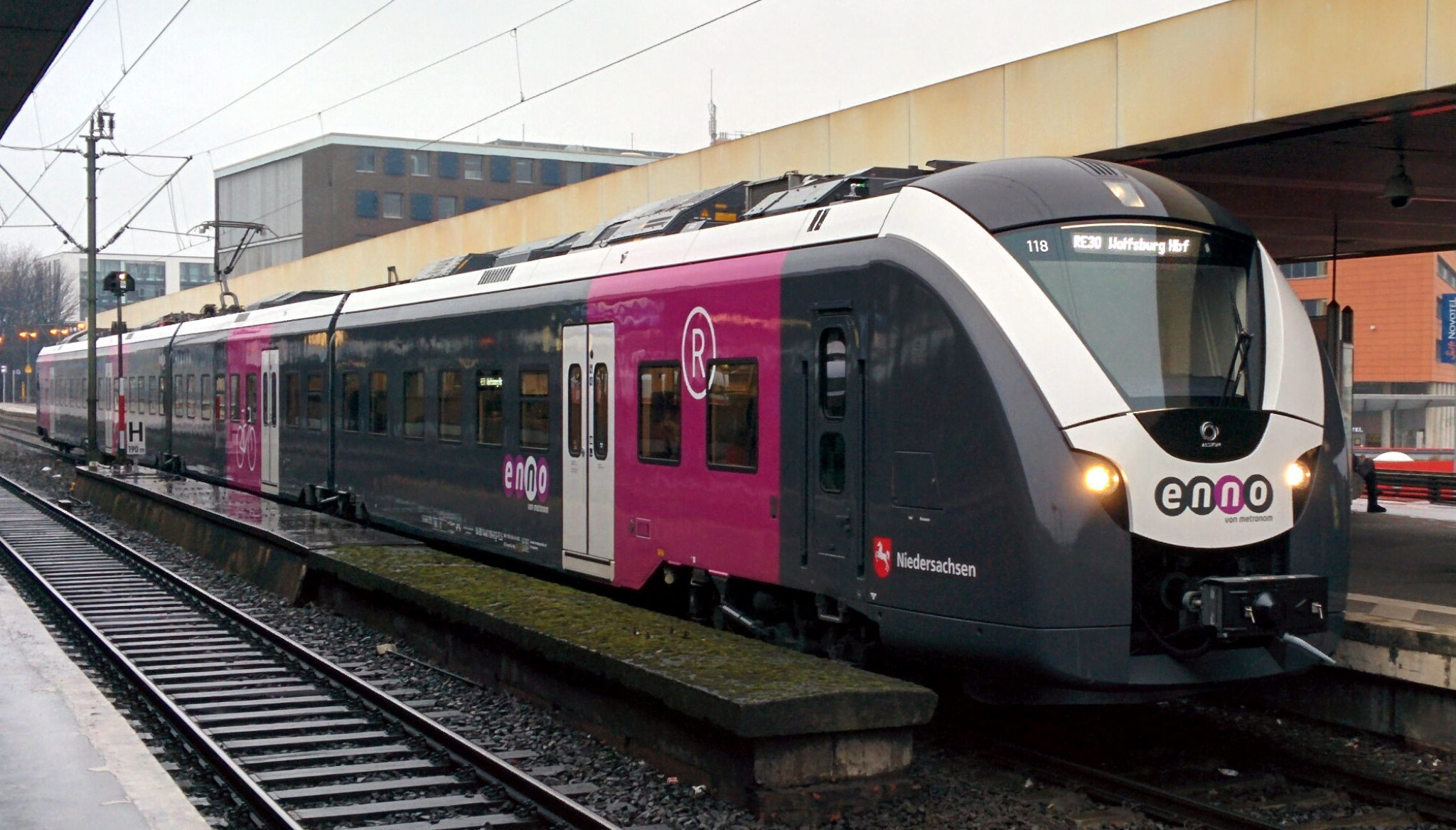
Coradia Continental (Class 1440) of Metronom

==== Greece ====
In December 2025, Alstom received a €393 million order from Hellenic Train for 23 Coradia Stream EMUs that would be constructed at the Savigliano manufacturing site. The contract is part of Hellenic Train's aims of modernization and improvement of the Greek railway network, which includes infrastructure as well as rolling stock supply. The contract also includes associated maintenance services over a period of 10 years on Alstom's behalf. 11 of the units would be intended for commuter rail usage in and around the areas of Athens and Thessaloniki, with the remaining 12 intended for longer-distance intercity services. A test train from Bulgaria began testing throughout the Greek railway network in spring 2026, whereas the first units are expected to enter service within the second quarter of 2027. In June 2026, Deputy Minister of Transport Konstantinos Kyranakis revealed that the order had been raised from 23 to 25 trainsets, with two sets entering service ahead of schedule within the summer of 2026.

==== Italy ====
In September 2012, Alstom received a €67 million order from Ferrovie Nord Milano (FNM) for ten additional Coradia Meridian regional trains. Alstom had delivered 14 trains to FNM under the agreement by 2013. Ferrovie dello Stato ordered a further 70 Coradia Meridians from Alstom in November 2012. The Coradia has been used by Trenord for RegioExpress (RE) and for Malpensa Express service with the airport configuration Convoglio Servizio Aeroportuale (CSA).

Coradia Stream trains are operated by Trenitalia, Trenord, Ferrotramviaria, Trasporto Ferroviario Toscano and TUA.

==== Netherlands ====
The Alstom Coradia LINT, formerly also known as "Syntus LINT", had been used by Keolis (formerly known as Syntus) for regional transport. Arriva still operates LINT train sets on the mostly unelectrified Zutphen-Hengelo-Oldenzaal (ZHO) route.

Nederlandse Spoorwegen (NS) introduced its new NS Intercity Nieuwe Generatie, which is based on the Alstom Coradia Stream, in April 2023. By 2025 these new trainsets had largely replaced the currently aging ICMm trainsets. In addition these new trainsets have replaced the BeNeLux trains from Amsterdam to Brussels, now branded as Eurocity Direct.

==== Norway ====
In January 2022, Norske tog signed an agreement to buy 30 new Coradia Nordic trains from Alstom, with the option to buy an additional 170 trains. The trains are intended for commuter service in the Oslo area and will have six cars and a top speed of 160 km/h. They will be classified as "Class 77" in the old NSB system and "N05" in the new Norske Tog system. Production of the new trains will start in 2023. The first trains are due in Norway for testing in 2026, and the trains will be delivered and put into operation starting later that year. An additional order for 25 more trains was announced in February 2023. 19 of these will be classified N06 and will be outfitted for regional service with more seats and a top speed of 200 km/h.

==== Poland ====
In September 2025 Polish state-owned intercity train operator PKP Intercity awarded a contract for 42 electric multiple units (with an option to buy 30 further trainsets) to Alstom. The EMUs will be based on the Coradia Max variant and are likely to leverage designs used in the NS Intercity Nieuwe Generatie project in the Netherlands, as they will be serving intercity routes with a top speed of 200 km/h.

==== Romania ====
In March 2022, the Romanian Railway Reform Authority or ARF (Romanian: Authoritatea pentru Reformă Feroviară) for short, signed an order for 20 Coradia Stream trains with 15 years of maintenance, which will be leased to CFR Calatori and Romanian private operators. The order has an option for an additional 17 trains, with an additional 15 years of maintenance, bringing the total to 37 trains with 30 years of maintenance. This option was activated in September 2022 when an additional contract was signed. The Coradia Stream model ordered is 160 meters long, has a passenger capacity of 352, and can only run on Romania's 27kV ~ 50 Hz AC network. These are equipped with PZB90 and ETCS Level 2.

==== Sweden ====
The Coradia Nordic is used for Storstockholms Lokaltrafik (designated X60) for commuter services in and around the Stockholm area. In June 2012, Storstockholms Lokaltrafik placed a €440 million ($548 million) order for 46 Coradia Nordic trains; this reportedly brought the total orders of Nordic trains to 129. Several more contracts have been signed for other Swedish operators, principally Skånetrafiken in Skåne County. In February 2015, Skånetrafiken placed an order worth approximately €150 million for 25 Coradia Nordics. Both the Continental and Nordic varieties were originally marketed as Coradia Lirex.

A version of the Coradia Duplex, the SJ X40, used by SJ AB, was originally supposed to be used for regional traffic around Mälaren in Sweden. However, SJ AB has also deployed the train on an intercity route between Stockholm and Gothenburg.

Name	Image	Introduced	Number	Carriages	Power Type	Notes
X3		1999	7	4	Pantograph	Used in Arlanda Express between Stockholm Central Station and Stockholm Arlanda Airport.
X40		2006–2008	43	2 or 3	Pantograph	
X60 X60A X60B		X60: 2005–2008; X60A: 2012; X60B: 2016–present	129	6	Pantograph	Used in commuter services.
X61		2009–present, multiple orders for multiple operators	134	4	Pantograph	Used in commuter and regional services.
X62		2012	11	4	Pantograph	Used in the Norrtåg regional services in Västernorrland, Jämtland, Västerbotten and Norrbotten counties. They also have a bistro.

==== United Kingdom ====
===== Coradia 1000 =====
The first British units entered service in 2001. The family is represented by two sub-families. The diesel-powered Coradia 1000 family consists of Class 175 (27 units) of which 7 units are currently undergoing testing with Great Western Railway, and Class 180 Adelante (14 units), a 125 mph (201 km/h) high-speed train of which 10 units are used by Grand Central.

===== Coradia Juniper =====
The electric Coradia Juniper family consists of the Class 334 (used for Glasgow commuter services, 40 units), the Class 458 (used on routes from London Waterloo to Reading, 30 units), and formerly included the Class 460 (originally used for Gatwick Express airport services), which were incorporated into the 458 fleet by early 2016.

Class	Image	Operator	Introduced	Number	Carriages	End Gangways	Power	Notes
175		Great Western Railway	1999–2001	26 (1 for spare parts)	2 or 3	No	Diesel	The end two cars are labeled A and C irrespective of there being a coach B in the middle. [32]
180		Grand Central	2000–2001	(14 built, 10 in service)	5	No	Diesel	
334		ScotRail	1999–2002	40	3	No	25 kV 50 Hz AC / Pantograph	
458 (4-JUP and 5-JUP)		South Western Railway	1998–2002	28(8 as 458/5)	4 and 5	Yes	750 V DC / Contact shoe	Built as 4 car 458/0 for South West Trains, converted to 5 car 458/5 for South West Trains in 2012–2013. Converted to 4 car 458/4 in 2022-2024
460 (8-GAT)		Gatwick Express	1999–2001	8	8	No	750 V DC / Contact shoe	Withdrawn from service in 2012 and converted to Class 458/5 for South West Trains.

=== North America ===
==== Canada ====
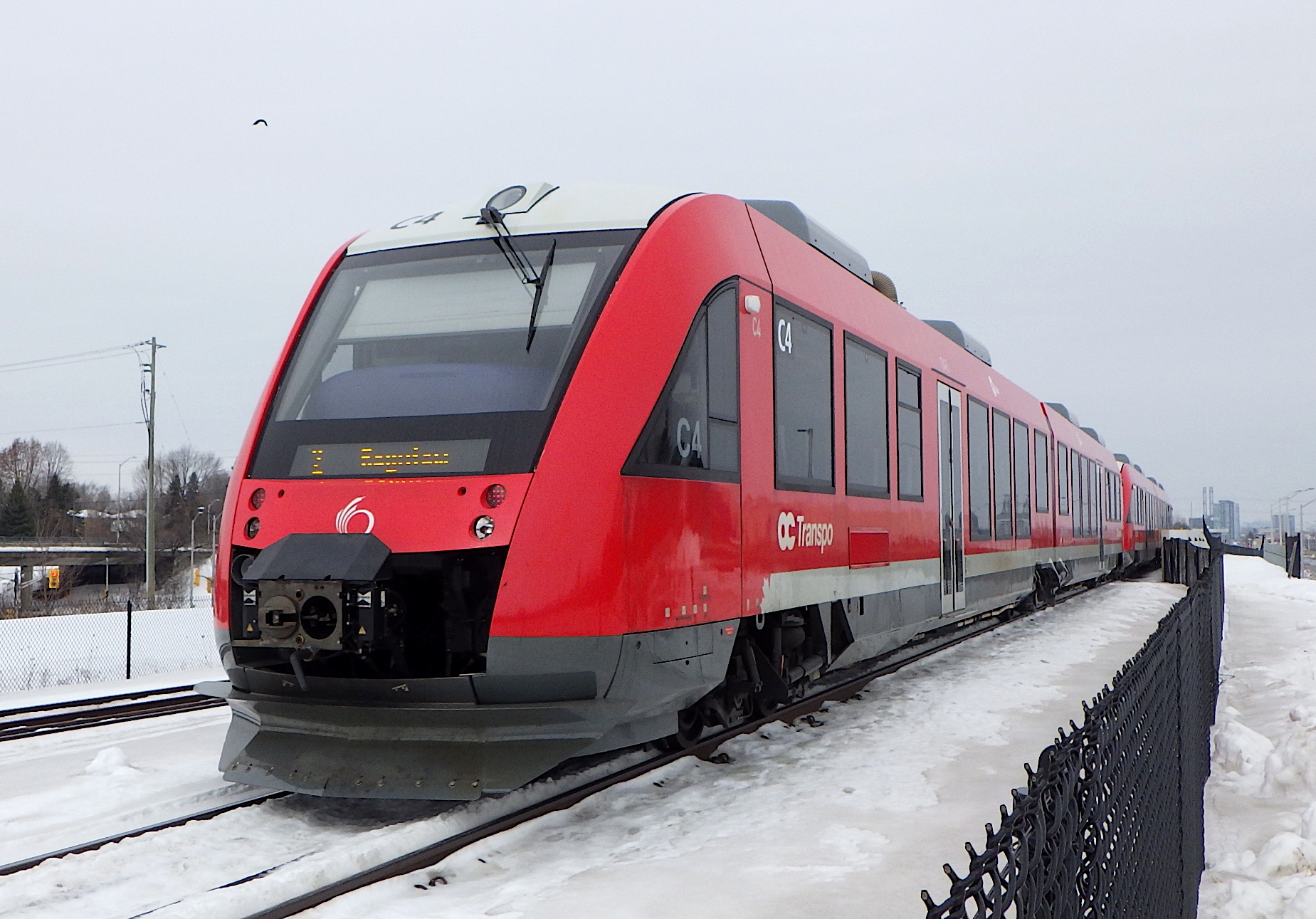
A Coradia Lint on the O-Train Trillium Line in Ottawa, 2025

Canada was the first country in North America to operate Coradia trains, with OC Transpo in Ottawa deploying six diesel Coradia LINTs on the O-Train Trillium Line in 2015 to replace the previous Bombardier Talent trains, and have subsequently also been used on O-Train Line 4 to the airport since 2025.

The private Charlevoix Railway, in Québec, temporarily operated hydrogen based iLINTs as a demonstration in the summer of 2023.

==== United States ====
Metra is purchasing 200 bilevel Coradia passenger cars and has an option to purchase 300 more, while Virginia Railway Express—who partnered with Metra on the procurement—is purchasing 21 bilevel Coradia trailer cars with an option for another 44 trailers and 4 cab control cars.

=== Africa ===
==== Algeria ====
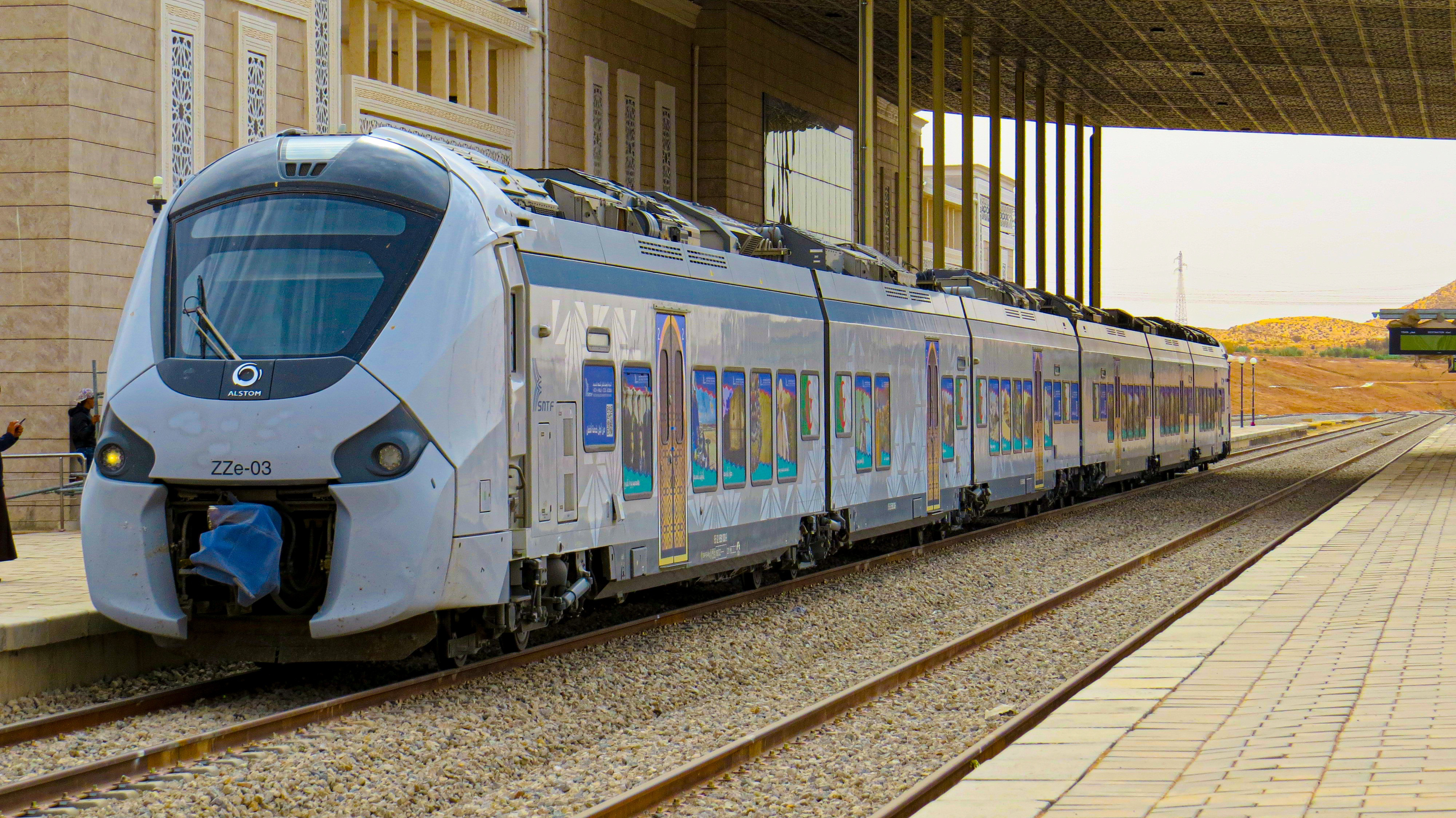
SNTF ZZe-03, a Coradia Polyvalent, in 2023.

In July 2015, the Société Nationale des Transports Ferroviaires (SNTF), Algeria's national railway operator, placed an order with Alstom for the supply of 17 bi-mode Coradia Polyvalent trainsets for use on mainline and intercity services. Dynamic testing for the trains started in December 2017 at the Velim railway test circuit, and the first train was delivered to the SNTF on January 29, 2018. The fleet entered service on the national rail network on March 2, 2018.

The trains are designated as the Class ZZe under the SNTF's classification system, with series numbers ZZe-01 to ZZe-17.

==== Senegal ====
Alstom began deliveries of fifteen four-car Coradia Polyvalent trainsets for the Train Express Regional between Dakar and the Blaise Diagne International Airport in Senegal in late 2018.

== Accidents and incidents ==
- On 16 January 2008, 334017 was involved in a minor collision whilst entering Glasgow Central station. The unit was working the 08:24 Gourock to Glasgow Central service when it collided with an empty, stationary Class 318. The train was travelling at less than 4 mph (6 km/h) when the collision occurred. Four passengers were slightly injured; however only one required hospital attention, and was transferred to Glasgow Southern General hospital in a taxi. The unit was undamaged.
- On 16 January 2010, unit 175103 operating the 08:30 service from Manchester Piccadilly to Milford Haven struck two cars at Moreton-on-Lugg crossing between Hereford and Leominster. The front seat passenger in one of the cars was fatally injured, although there were no casualties on the train. The train did not derail. The signaller had raised the barriers in error when the train was approaching the crossing, and he was arrested on suspicion of manslaughter in July 2010; he was convicted of charges under health and safety legislation following a trial at Birmingham Crown Court in 2013, and was fined £1,750 and ordered to carry out 275 hours of community service. The same service collided with a trailer on the Morfa Main level crossing near Kidwelly on 31 January 2011. No-one was injured, but the unit involved, 175108, received nearly £82,000 worth of damage due to striking the trailer at 75 miles per hour (121 km/h). The farmer in charge of the trailer was sentenced to a 36-week suspended jail sentence and was ordered to carry out 200 hours of community work.
- On 19 December 2011, unit 175002 collided with a lorry at the Llanboidy level crossing near Whitland. The train was operating the service from Milford Haven to Manchester Piccadilly and the driver of the lorry was arrested on suspicion of endangering safety.
- On 30 January 2015, a small explosion occurred underneath a driving vehicle of unit 458501 near Windsor & Eton Riverside station. The Rail Accident Investigation Branch determined that this was caused by a join between three underfloor power cables not being secured correctly when the unit was rebuilt in 2014.
- On 15 October 2015, 334016 was involved in a collision on the approach to Uphall railway station. The unit was working the 16:39 Edinburgh to Milngavie service when it collided with an empty Toyota Hilux pick-up truck which had been stolen and abandoned on the tracks. The train was travelling at approximately 75 mph (121 km/h) when the collision occurred. The unit did not derail, but one passenger suffered minor injuries to their hand from broken glass.
- On 12 July 2016, an Alstom Coradia was involved in a head-on collision at Andria, Apulia, Italy. At least 20 people were killed.
- In February 2018, following the discovery of a number of instances of damaged wheels on Class 175 units, the entire fleet was temporarily withdrawn from service for safety checks. After further investigation, it was found that a track fault between Newport and Cwmbran had caused wheel damage to several trains, not only Class 175s but also some Class 158s.
- On 21 December 2019, unit 458519 was involved in a collision with a car between Wokingham and Bracknell. Nobody was seriously injured.
- 16 October 2020, a Dutch ICNG unit was being towed from Poland on delivery to the Netherlands when the train derailed at Dreileben, Germany. The driver of the locomotive hauling the train was injured.
- Class 175 units have caught fire in 2004 at Preston (175008), 2009 at Prestatyn, 2011 at Manchester Piccadilly, 2017 both at Shrewsbury (175109) and between Chester and Crewe, 2018 at Deganwy, and in 2019 both near Pontrilas (175107) and at Gowerton (175102).
- On 8 February 2023, Transport for Wales Rail unit 175008 was travelling from Holyhead to Cardiff Central when the North Wales Fire and Rescue Service and Network Rail were alerted to a fire aboard the train. This was followed by two further fires, both at Wilmslow, on 22 February and 1 March 2023. All three fires were attributed to a build-up of "debris, leaf litter, and other contaminants" in the units' under-floor engine bays; CAF, who had taken over Chester Traincare Centre from Alstom, had stopped periodic underframe cleaning of the units, and had to implement a remediation programme. Acknowledging that the three incidents in quick succession would "raise concerns", TfW Rail decided on 2 March to temporarily withdraw from service all Class 175 units that had not been through the cleaning programme. This caused disruption to TfW operations, though the level of disruption reduced in the following days as cleaned units returned to service. A further remediation includes replacement of the engines' intercoolers.

== Gallery ==
Alstom Coradia family range
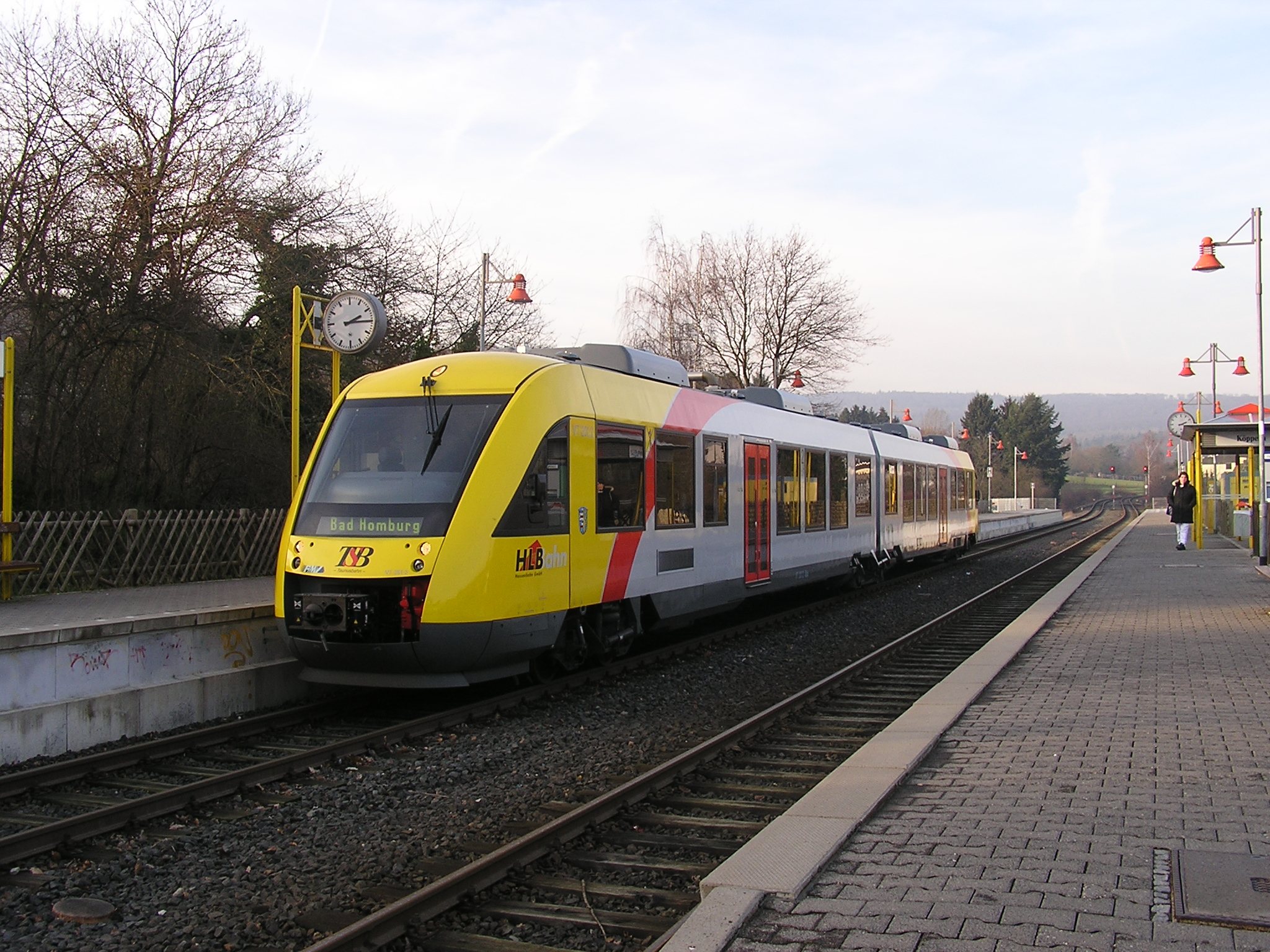
Alstom Coradia LINT

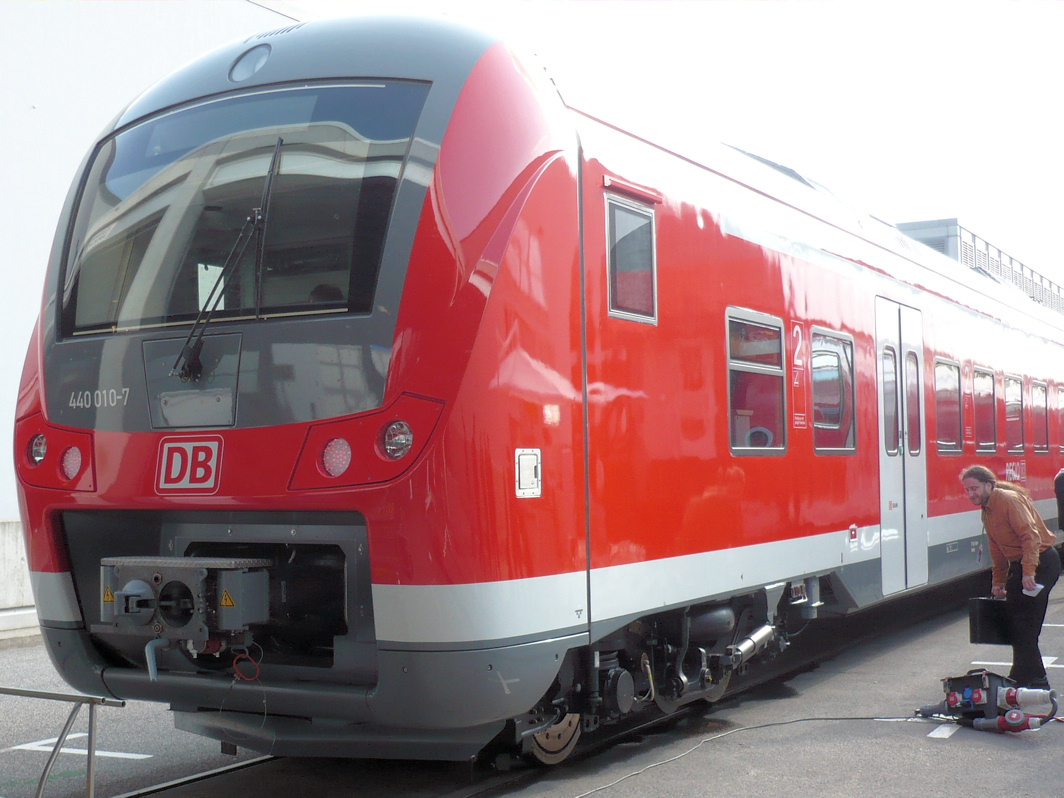
Alstom Coradia Continental (1st type, DB class 440)

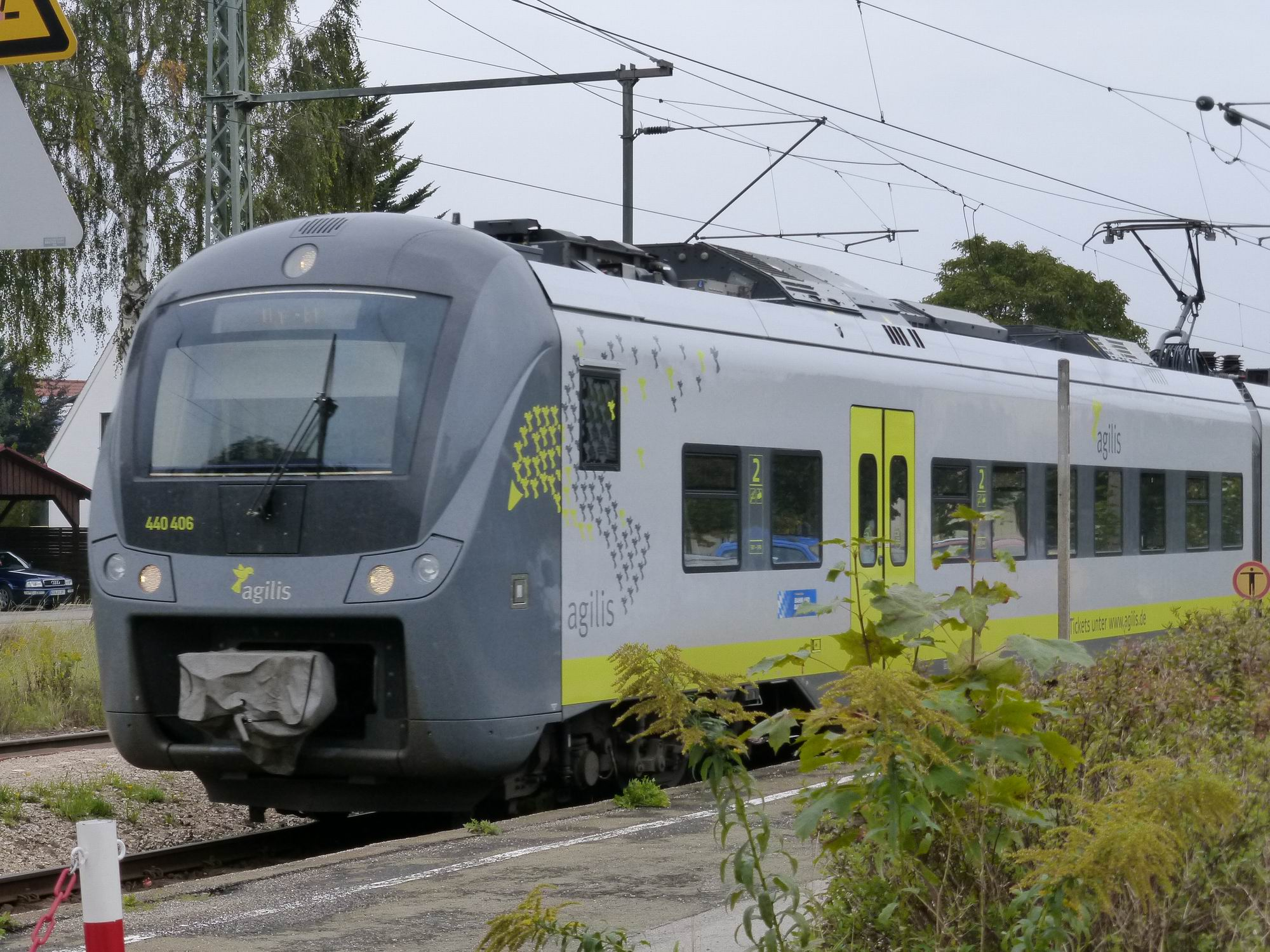
Alstom Coradia Continental owned by agilis

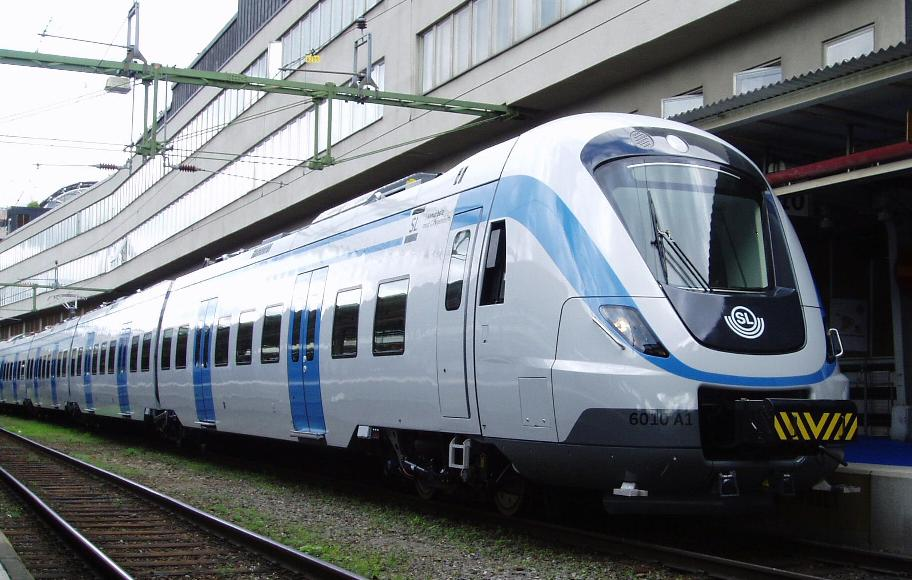
Alstom Coradia Nordic

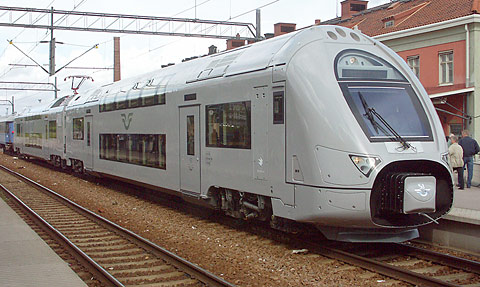
Alstom Coradia Duplex

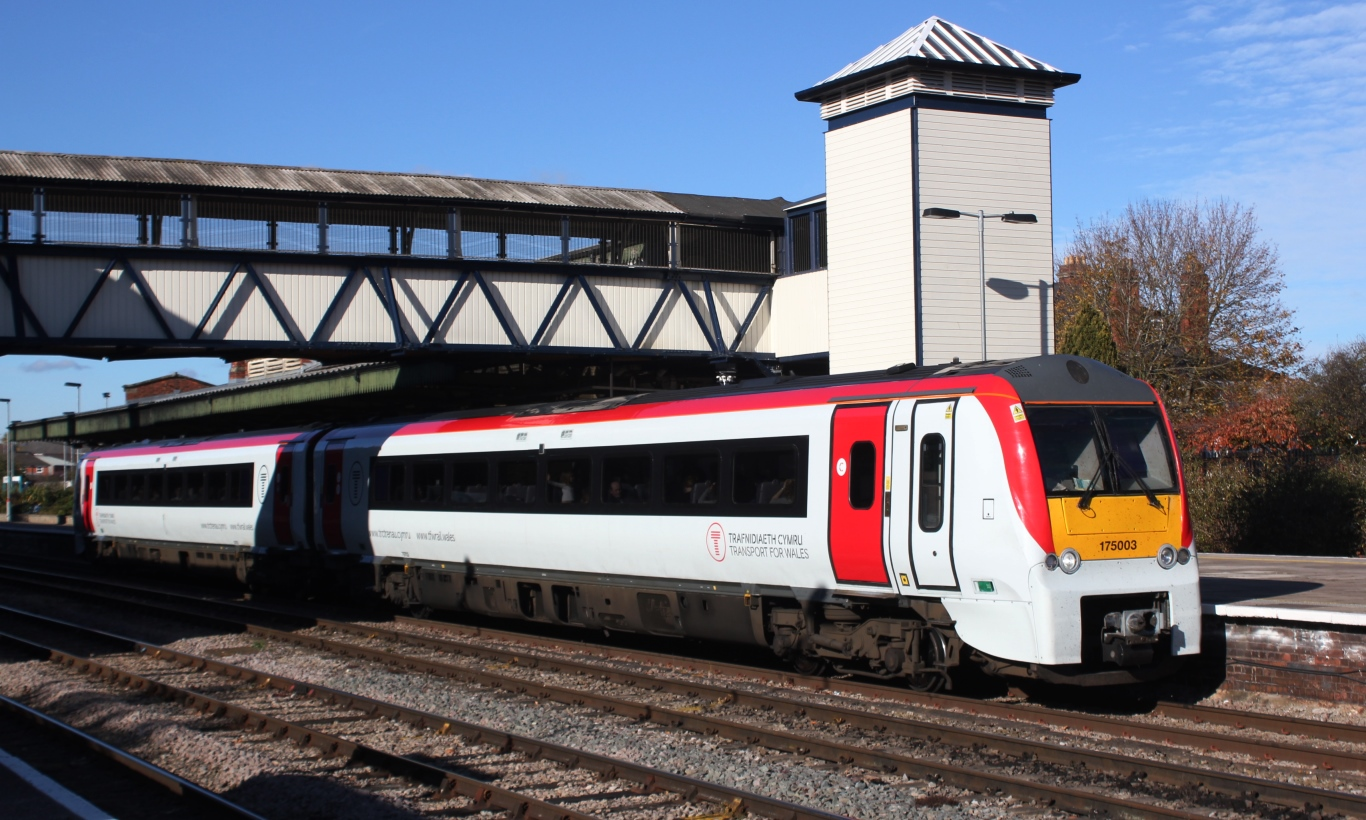
British Rail Class 175

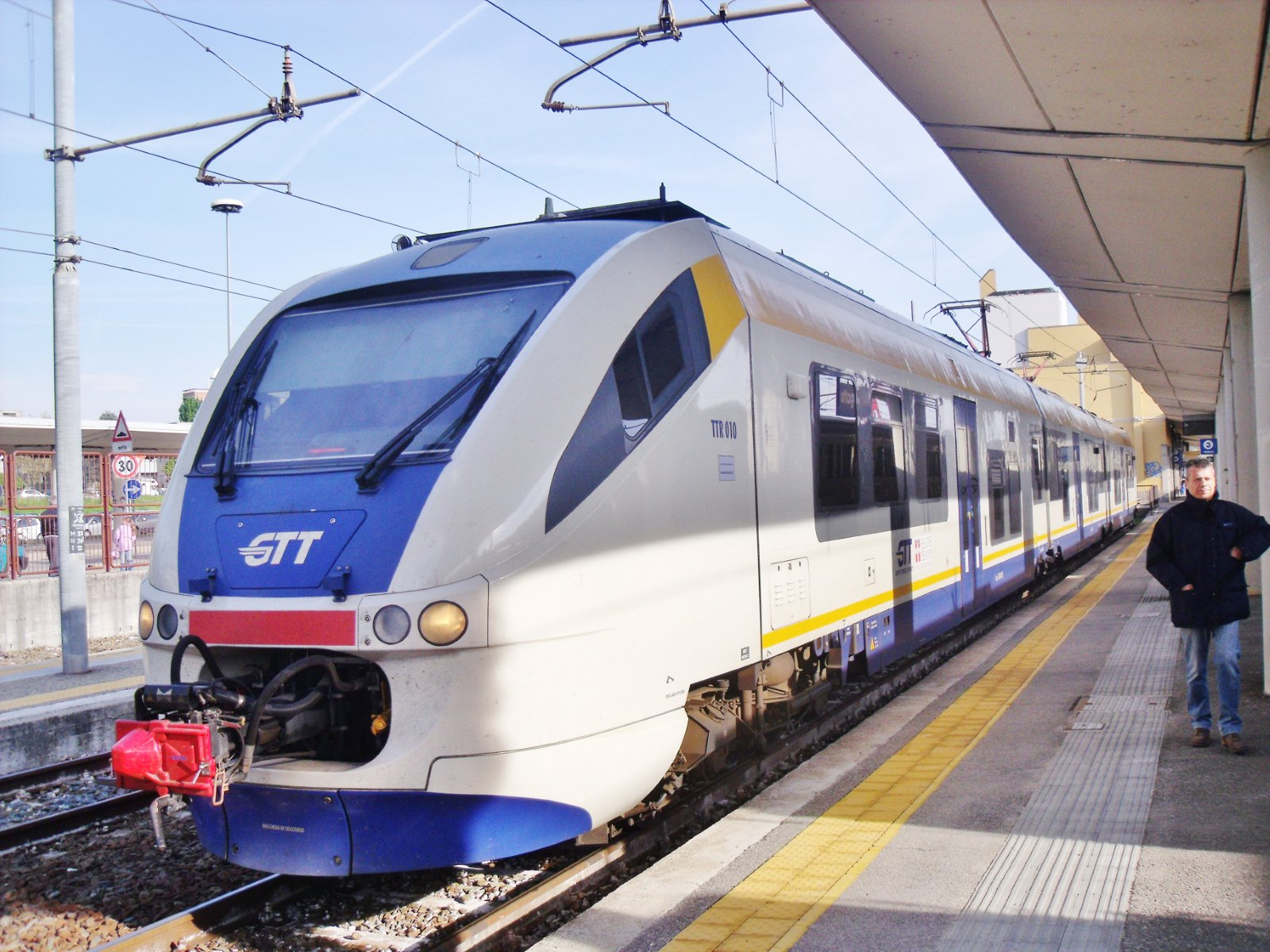
Alstom Coradia Meridian

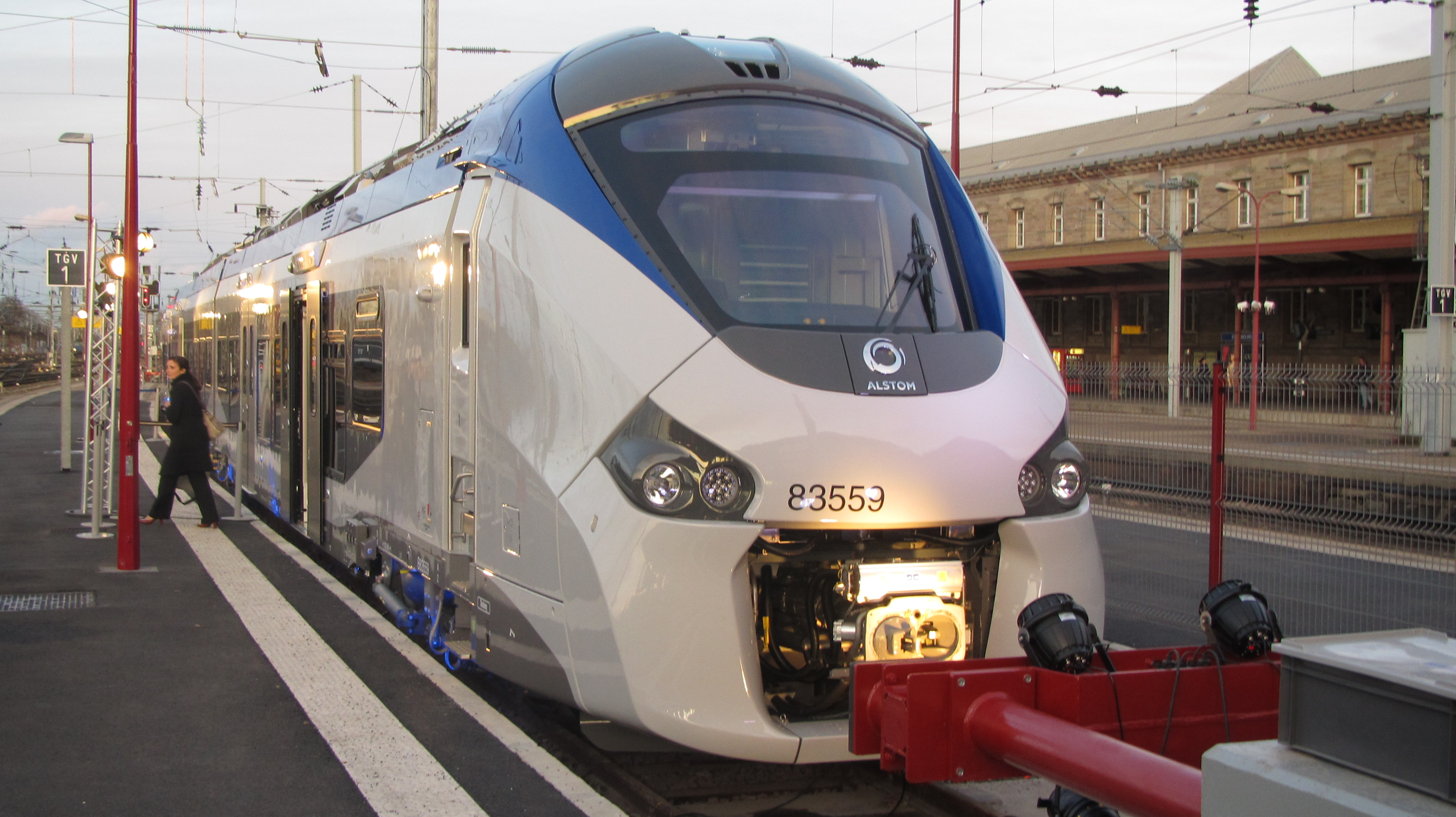
Alstom Coradia Polyvalent

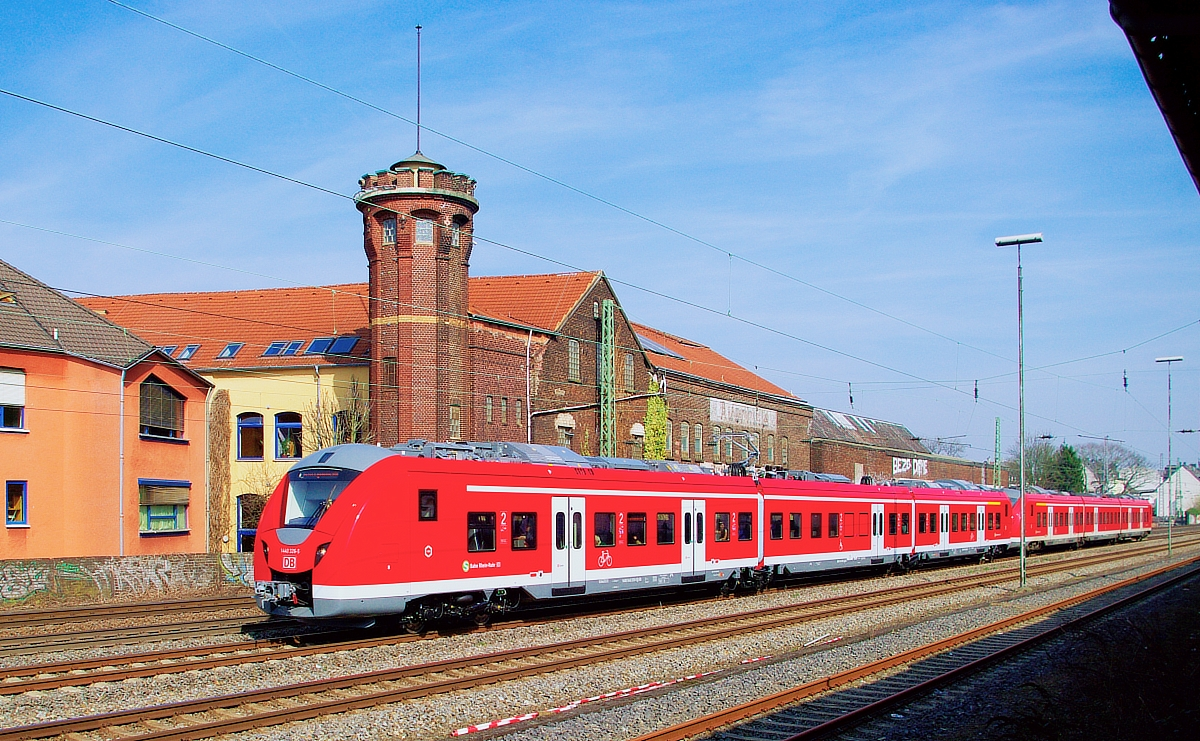
Alstom Coradia Continental (2nd type, DB class 1440)

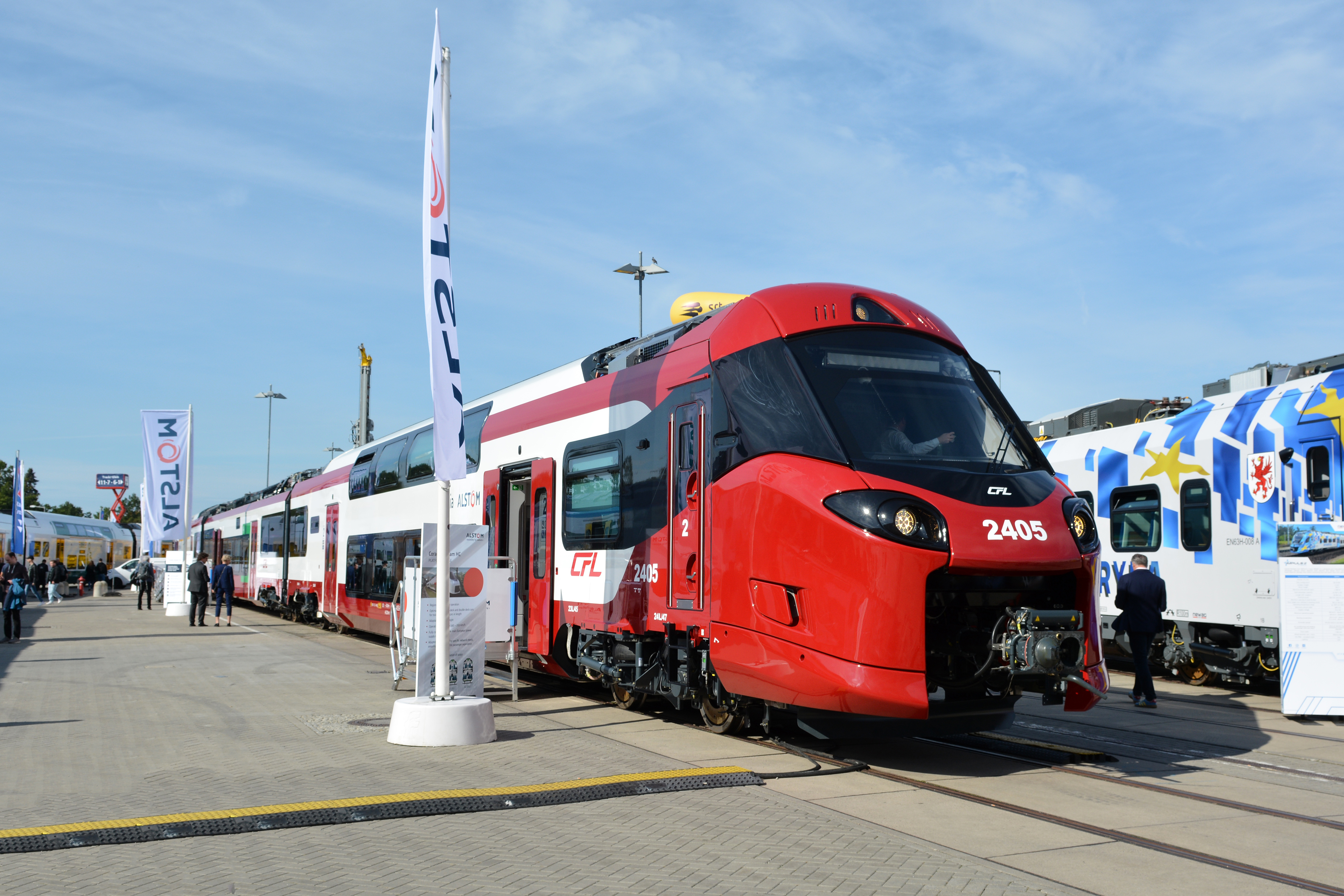
Alstom Coradia Stream HC for Luxembourg (Innotrans Berlin 2022)

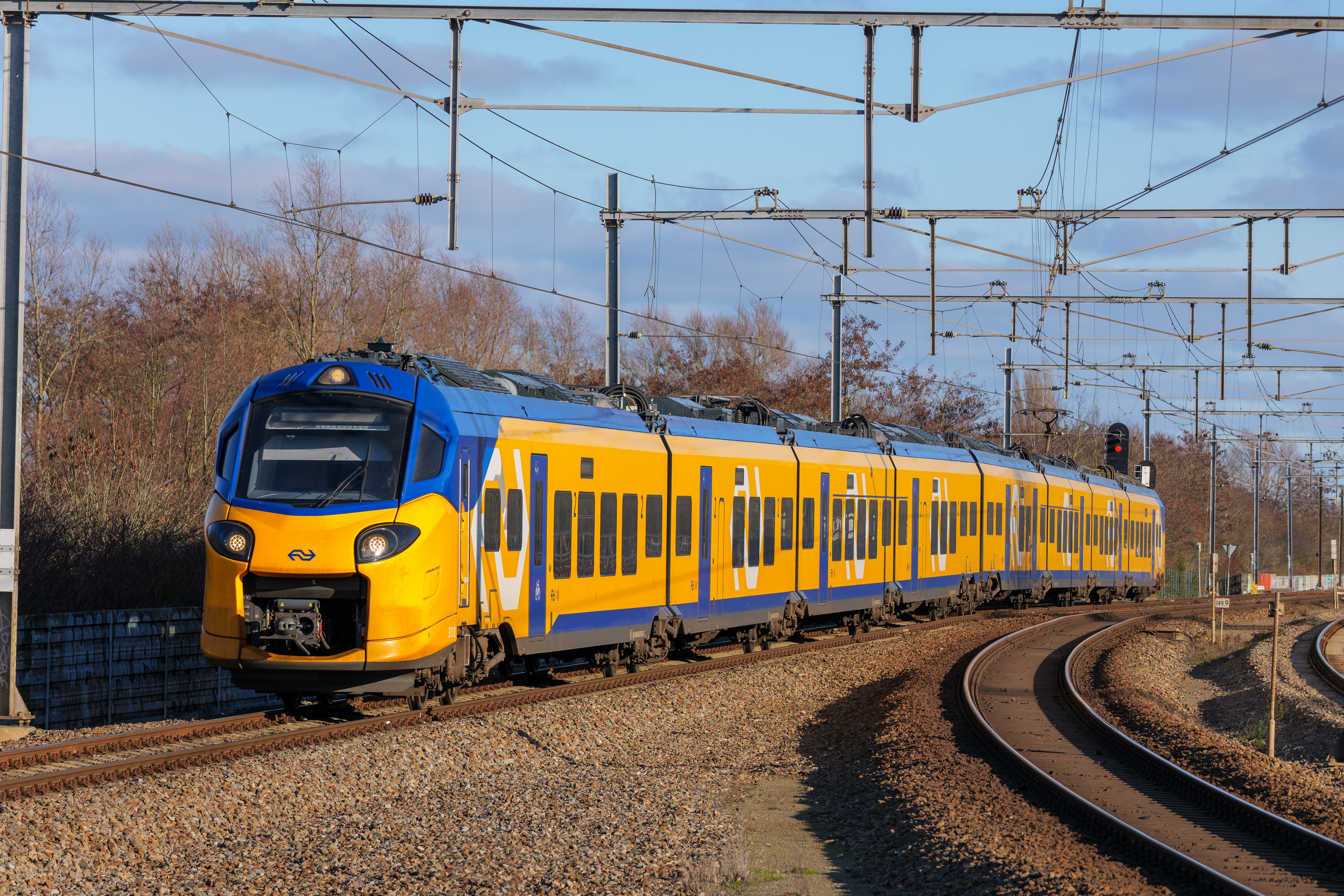
Alstom Coradia Stream of NS passing Duivendrecht station

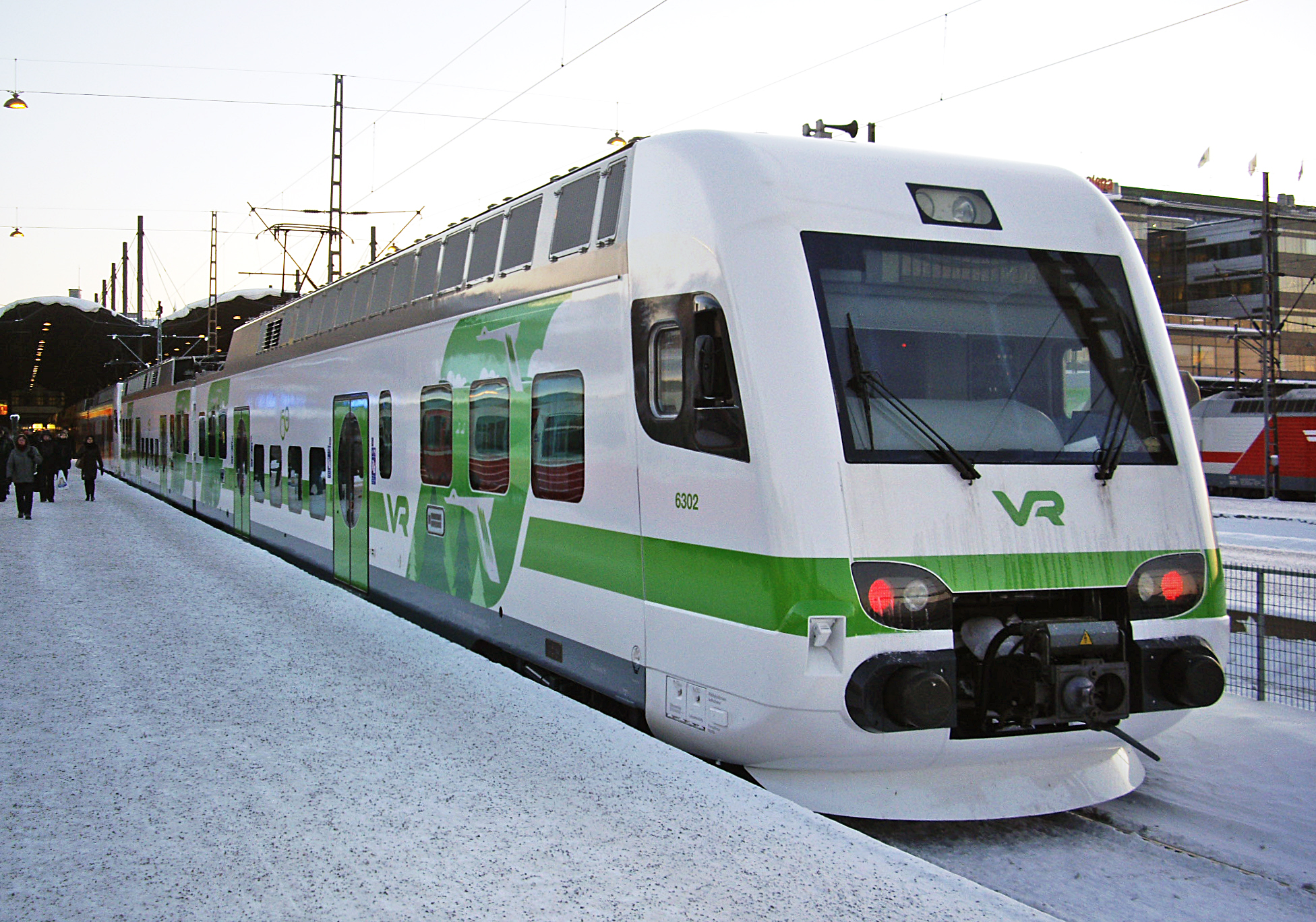
VR Class Sm4

== Sources ==
- A. Knitter (2000), "Alstom : Doppelstockzugkonzept CORADIA Duplex", Eisenbahningenieur (in German), 51 (9): 18–20, ISSN 0013-2810

Coradia UK

- "Diesel train family Coradia for intercity service", Железные Дороги Мира (in Russian) (5), 2001, archived from the original on 3 May 2007
- J. Abbott (1999), Modern Railways (612): 666–670
