= Pops =

Pops may refer to:

== Name or nickname ==
- Pops, an informal term of address for a father or elder
- Pops (nickname), a list of people
- Pops (Muppet), a Muppets character
- Pops (Johnny Bravo), a character from the Cartoon Network animated television series Johnny Bravo
- Pops Maellard, a fictional character in the Cartoon Network animated series Regular Show
- Pops Mensah-Bonsu, a British basketball executive and former player

== Other uses ==
- Pops CB, a baseball club in Spain in the 1950s and '60s
- Pops (restaurant), a themed roadside attraction in Arcadia, Oklahoma
- Pops, strikes with a paddle during school corporal punishment in the United States
- Privately owned public space (POPS), a physical space that, though privately owned, is open to the public
- Persistent organic pollutants (POPs), organic compounds that are resistant to environmental degradation
- Sirius XM Pops, a Sirius XM Satellite Radio station

== See also ==
- Pops orchestra, an orchestra that plays popular music (generally traditional pop) and show tunes as well as well-known classical works, including:
  - Boston Pops Orchestra, a subsection of the Boston Symphony Orchestra
  - Philly Pops
- Corn Pops (also termed Pops), a Kellogg's breakfast cereal
- Pop (disambiguation)
