= Poppen =

Poppen is a surname. Notable people with the surname include:

- Brent Poppen (born 1973), American wheelchair rugby player, wheelchair tennis player and activist
- Claudio Poppen (born 1974), Aruban football player
- Christoph Poppen (born 1956), German conductor
- Chuck Poppen (born 1952/1953), American television station manager
- Diemut Poppen, German violist
- Sean Poppen (born 1994), American baseball player
- Sherm Poppen (1930–2019), American engineer and inventor

== See also ==
- Poppens
- Poppin' (disambiguation)
