= Poppin' =

Poppin' or Poppin may refer to:

== Music ==
- Poppin' (album), a 1980 album recorded in 1957 by Hank Mobley, or the title song
- "Poppin'" (Chris Brown song), a 2005 single by Chris Brown
- "Poppin'", a 2009 song by Utada, from the album This Is the One
- "Poppin'", a 2015 song by Rico Richie produced by 808 Mafia
- "Poppin" (KSI song), a 2020 song by KSI featuring Lil Pump and Smokepurpp
- "Poppin", a 2022 song by Yeat from the album 2 Alive
- “Poppin” a song by Rico Nasty from the Mixtape Album Sugar Trap 2 (2017)

== People ==
- Poppin' Hyun Joon, South Korean dancer, rapper and singer
- Keith Poppin, reggae artist

== Other uses ==
- Poppin' Fresh, Pillsbury mascot

== See also ==
- "P-Poppin", 2003 single by Ludacris
- "Poppin' Them Thangs", 2003 single by G-Unit
- Popping, a dance style
- Popping (disambiguation)
- Poppins, 2012 anthology film
- Poppen
