= Poppens =

Poppens is a surname. Notable people with the surname include:

- Chelsea Poppens (born 1991), American basketball player
- Tjapko Poppens (born 1970), Dutch mayor

== See also ==
- Poppen
