= Popping (disambiguation) =

Popping is a style of street dance.

Popping may also refer to:

- Joint popping, the action of moving joints to produce a sharp cracking or popping sound
- Popping (computer graphics), an unwanted visual effect that occurs when changing the level of detail of a 3D model
- Popping corn, popcorn
- Skin popping, a method of drug administration
- Slapping and popping, two different playing techniques used on the double bass and on the (electric) bass guitar
- Popping (EP)
- Pimple popping, manual bursting of a pimple

== See also ==
- Pop (disambiguation)
- Poppin' (disambiguation)
- Robot (dance), a street dance style often confused with popping
