= Build–operate–transfer =

Form of project financing

Build–operate–transfer (BOT) or build–own–operate–transfer (BOOT) is a form of project delivery method, usually for large-scale infrastructure projects, wherein a private entity receives a concession from the public sector (or the private sector on rare occasions) to finance, design, construct, own, and operate a facility stated in the concession contract. The private entity will have the right to operate it for a set period of time. This enables the project proponent to recover its investment and operating and maintenance expenses in the project.

BOT is usually a model used in public–private partnerships. Due to the long-term nature of the arrangement, the fees are usually raised during the concession period. The rate of increase is often tied to a combination of internal and external variables, allowing the proponent to reach a satisfactory internal rate of return for its investment.

Countries where BOT is prevalent include Thailand, Turkey, Taiwan, Bahrain, Pakistan, Saudi Arabia, Israel, India, Iran, Croatia, Japan, China, Vietnam, Malaysia, Philippines, Egypt, Myanmar and a few US states (California, Florida, Indiana, Texas, and Virginia). However, in some countries, such as Canada, Australia, New Zealand and Nepal, the term used is build–own–operate–transfer (BOOT). The first BOT was for the China Hotel, built in 1979 by the Hong Kong listed conglomerate Hopewell Holdings Ltd (controlled by Sir Gordon Wu).

== BOT framework ==
BOT finds extensive application in infrastructure projects and public–private partnership. In the BOT framework a third party, for example the public administration, delegates to a private sector entity to design and build infrastructure and to operate and maintain these facilities for a certain period. During this period, the private party has the responsibility to raise the finance for the project and is entitled to retain all revenues generated by the project and is the owner of the aforementioned facilities. The facility will be then transferred to the public administration at the end of the concession agreement, without any remuneration of the private entity involved. Some or even all of the following different parties could be involved in any BOT project:

- The host government: Normally, the government is the initiator of the infrastructure project and decides if the BOT model is appropriate to meet its needs. In addition, the political and economic circumstances are main factors for this decision. The government provides normally support for the project in some form (provision of the land/ changed laws).
- The concessionaire: The project sponsors who act as concessionaire create a special purpose entity which is capitalised through their financial contributions.
- Lending banks: Most BOT projects are funded to a large extent by commercial debt. The bank will be expected to finance the project on "non-recourse" basis meaning that it has recourse to only the special purpose entity and all its assets for the repayment of the debt.
- Other lenders: The special purpose entity might have other lenders such as national or regional development banks.
- Parties to the project contracts: Because the special purpose entity has only limited workforce, it will subcontract a third party to perform its obligations under the concession agreement. Additionally, it has to assure that it has adequate supply contracts in place for the supply of raw materials and other resources necessary for the project.

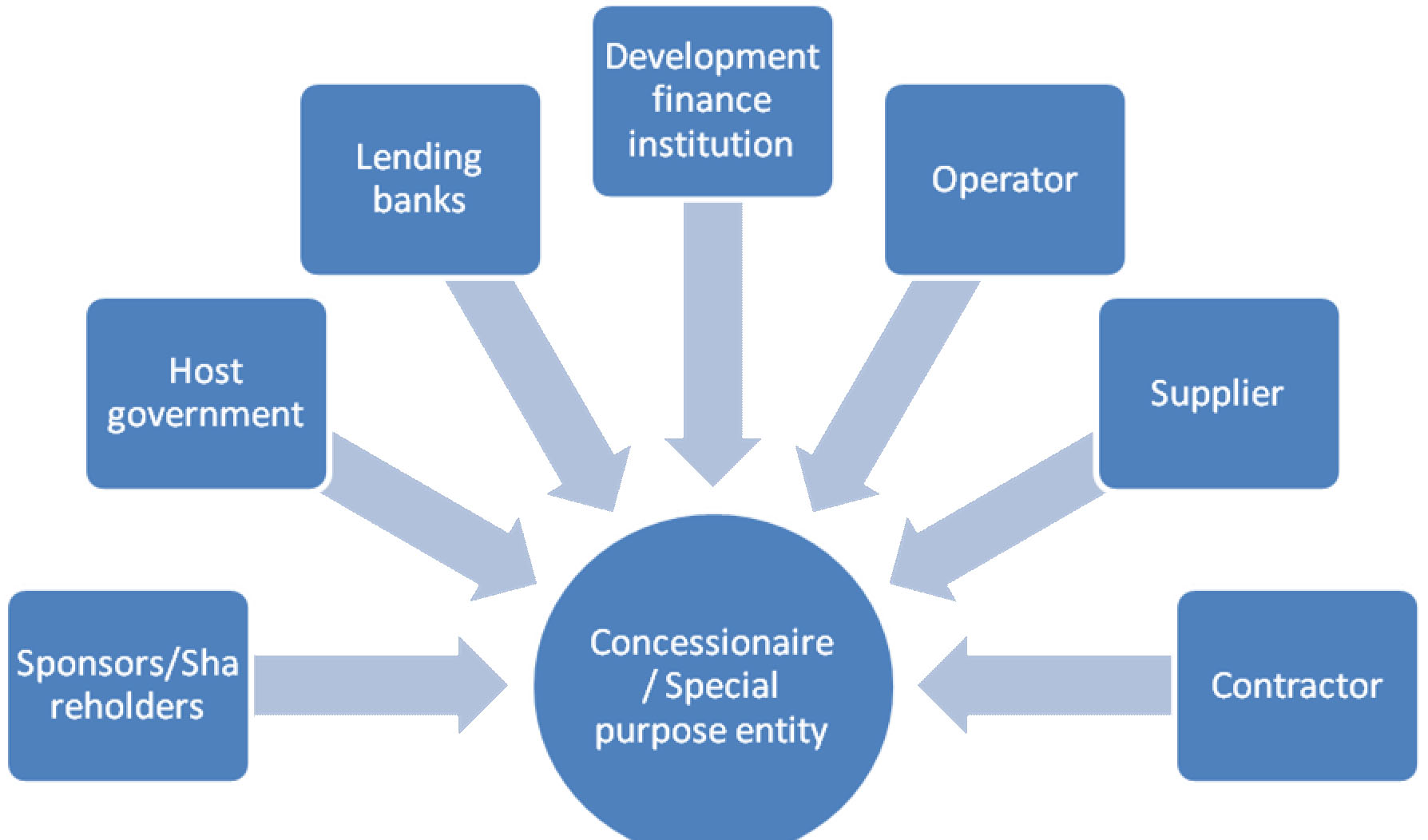
BOT model

A BOT project is typically used to develop a discrete asset rather than a whole network and is generally entirely new or greenfield in nature (although refurbishment may be involved). In a BOT project the project company or operator generally obtains its revenues through a fee charged to the utility/ government rather than tariffs charged to consumers. A number of projects are called concessions, such as toll road projects, which are new build and have a number of similarities to BOTs.

In general, a project is financially viable for the private entity if the revenues generated by the project cover its cost and provide sufficient return on investment. On the other hand, the viability of the project for the host government depends on its efficiency in comparison with the economics of financing the project with public funds. Even if the host government could borrow money on better conditions than a private company could, other factors could offset this particular advantage. For example, the expertise and efficiency that the private entity is expected to bring as well as the risk transfer. Therefore, the private entity bears a substantial part of the risk. These are some types of the most common risks involved:

- Political risk: especially in the developing countries because of the possibility of dramatic overnight political change.
- Technical risk: construction difficulties, for example unforeseen soil conditions, breakdown of equipment
- Financing risk: foreign exchange rate risk and interest rate fluctuation, market risk (change in the price of raw materials), income risk (over-optimistic cash-flow forecasts), cost overrun risk

== Alternatives to BOT ==
The scale of investment by the private sector and type of arrangement means there is typically no strong incentive for early completion of a project or to deliver a product at a reasonable price. This type of private sector participation is also known as design-build.

Modified versions of the "turnkey" procurement and BOT "build-operate-transfer" models exist for different types of public-private partnership (PPP) projects, in which the main contractor is appointed to design and construct the works. This contrasts with the traditional procurement route (the build-design model), where the client first appoints consultants to design the development and then a contractor to construct the work.

The private contractor designs and builds a facility for a fixed fee, rate, or total cost, which is one of the key criteria in selecting the winning bid. The contractor assumes the risks involved in the design and construction phases.

Turnkey procurement under a design-build contract means that the design-build team would serve as the owner’s representative to determine the specific needs of the user groups; meet with the vendors to select the best options and pricing; advise the owner on the most logical options; plan and build the spaces to accommodate the function of the project; coordinate purchases and timelines; install the infrastructure; facilitate training of staff to use the equipment; and outline care and maintenance. In addition to being responsible for the design and construction of the work to the employer’s requirements, the contractor is also responsible for operating and maintaining the completed facility. The operation and maintenance period will span decades, during which time the contractor is said to have the "concession," is responsible for the operation of the facility, and benefits from operational income. The facility itself, however, remains the property of the employer.

A DBO(design-build-operate) contract is a project delivery model in which a single contractor is appointed to design and build a project and then to operate it for a period of time.

The common form of such a contract is a PPP (public-private partnership), in which a public client (e.g., a government or public agency) enters into a contract with a private contractor to design, build, and then operate the project, while the client finances the project and retains ownership.

DBFO stands for design-build-finance-operate, assigning a private organization the responsibility to design, build, finance, and operate a project. Financing is often easier for projects with high immediate demand, such as opening a new airport in a busy city.

BLT stands for build-lease-transfer, in which the public sector partner leases the project from the contractor and also takes responsibility for its operation.

ROT (renovate-operate-transfer) is a procurement method for infrastructure that already exists but is performing below standard.

when essential services are no longer operating efficiently or effectively, repairs can be costly. When an obsolete facility or amenity (any public service such as telephone lines, etc.) becomes outdated and requires expensive repairs, it can be financed through public-private partnerships between public entities and private contractors that are able to provide renovation services and operate the project management after the repairs have been completed.

== Economic theory ==
In contract theory, several authors have studied the pros and cons of bundling the building and operating stages of infrastructure projects. In particular, Oliver Hart (2003) has used the incomplete contracting approach in order to investigate whether incentives to make non-contractible investments are smaller or larger when the different stages of the project are combined under one private contractor. Hart (2003) argues that under bundling incentives to make cost-reducing investments are larger than under unbundling. However, sometimes the incentives to make cost-reducing investments may be excessive because they lead to overly large reductions of quality, so it depends on the details of the project whether bundling or unbundling is optimal. Hart's (2003) work has been extended in many directions. For example, Bennett and Iossa (2006) and Martimort and Pouyet (2008) investigate the interaction of bundling and ownership rights, while Hoppe and Schmitz (2013, 2021) explore the implications of bundling for making innovations.

== See also ==
- Adelaide–Darwin railway
- Central Texas Turnpike System
- Confederation Bridge
- Pay on production
- Private finance initiative
- Privatization
- Project finance
- Shadow toll
