= Pay on production =

Payment method

Pay on production (PoP) is a special build-operate-transfer (BOT) model, where payment is made to a supplier by the original equipment manufacturer (OEM) per piece produced on the supplier's own equipment by the OEM's employees.

== Description ==
Most build-operate-transfer systems work in a way that the final manufacturer (OEM) doesn't invest in the production equipment for parts or components but instead procures these parts from a supplier who organises production on his equipment. An example from vehicle manufacturing might be the assembly of wheels and tyres. The OEM might decide not to invest in a wheel assembly line but instead obtain from a supplier or logistics service provider delivery of these items just in sequence as these are needed at the OEM's assembly line: sometimes five with steel rim followed by four with light-alloy rim and a compact spare tire and so on. This is a longstanding and common methodology where the production and supply of many items and services are outsourced to other providers, typically to obtain better cost, quality and delivery performance than can be achieved in house, and also enable the OEM to better focus on core activities.

With PoP one important thing is different. The very equipment on which the OEM produces or assembles the final product, in the OEM factory, is supplied by, but still remains owned by, and is also maintained by, the equipment supplier. But it is still the OEM's personnel who assemble the products on the equipment and facilities. The external equipment supplier is then paid a fixed price for every product item which is assembled or produced on their equipment. The general idea of PoP is similar to using a rented car. The car is always owned and maintained by the car rental company but used or driven by the customer. The customer pays the car rental company for using the car, e.g. per every driven kilometre. However, in the assembly line case the contract is not just for a few days, rather both partners plan to keep the agreement for as long as the product is produced on the equipment, though it can be terminated before this. It means PoP is not therefore so much a production system, more of a financial model.

This concept was established by the German Ford Motor Company in Cologne for the Fiesta assembly line in 2002, and was soon recognised as the most productive in the world measured by working hours used to assemble a car. The new Fiesta was started on this line at 2008 and the high productivity remained (i.e. til 2010). This is despite the Cologne factory, because the buildings are 90 years old, is laid out in such a way that many new production developments just can't be introduced. For example, component suppliers can't deliver straight to the assembly line nor is there room for more flexible U-shaped assembly areas. Parts have to be delivered to a separate ‘supermarket’ type warehouse where kits of required parts are boxed and made up for use on the lines. For the Cologne factory the main assembly lines and some of the cells, for example where engines are fitted to the body, are owned and maintained by several equipment suppliers.

== History and Background ==
Within the beginning of the 21st century, the Ford Motor Company's goal was to focus and concentrate on designing new cars. There were no surplus funds available for investment in the modern manufacturing equipment needed at the Cologne plant. Indeed, for the equipment suppliers their participation in PoP was the only option available.

Most of the costs incurred by the OEM in PoP are variable costs such as labour and materials, though there is also in this case an additional variable cost for the equipment for every car produced. The fixed cost of the production equipment is borne the external equipment suppliers. For the OEM it means that PoP allows it to run its own production, but without incurring the high fixed capital cost of the equipment, and of course this cost is absent from any US GAAP balance sheet, not even included as a footnote, nor is it factor in assessment by financial rating agencies. Also with PoP much of the OEM's entrepreneurial risks are passed to the equipment supplier.

For the equipment supplier bearing the equipment capital cost can often be a financial problem, because, where these are SME companies, they are not always able to easily obtain sufficient investment capital, nor are they able to receive money from global financial markets. However the assembly lines and cells can't be sold or built without the supplier's permission and, most importantly, the equipment supplier, who has continuous contact with the lines and cells, is much closer to its customers so enabling ongoing CIP (continuous improvement process) both in the equipment maintenance and collaborative future line design improvements. CIP improvements in production stay with the OEM

Because the use of the practice by Ford in Cologne was so successful its use and adoption was tried at other Ford assembly plants. Perhaps not unsurprisingly, Ford has not been successful in their attempts to expand this Ford Cologne-based system elsewhere.

== Literature ==
- Decker, Christian; Paesler, Stephan: Financing of Pay-on-Production-Models. In: Knorr, Andreas et al.: Berichte aus dem Weltwirtschaftlichen Colloquium der Universität Bremen 92(2004)11, Online (PDF), checked at 2011-01-31.
- Decker, Christian; Paesler, Stephan: Pay-on-Production-Modelle : ein neuer Weg zur Cashflow-basierten Finanzierung von Fertigungs- und Transportsystemen. In: Betriebs Berater 35(2003), p. 1831–1837.
- Mast, Wolfgang F.: Pay on Production : langfristige Partnerschaft mit Verantwortungstransfer. In: Meier, Horst (Ed.): Dienstleistungsorientierte Geschäftsmodelle im Maschinen- und Anlagenbau : vom Basisangebot bis zum Betreibermodell. Berlin: Springer, 2004. - ISBN 3-540-40816-9 p. 15-29.
