= Population =

Population may refer to:

- Population (biology), a group of individuals
  - Wildlife population, group of non-human individuals
- Population (album), by The Most Serene Republic, 2007
- Population (human biology), a group of human individuals
- Population (journal), published by Institut national d'études démographiques
- Statistical population, a set of similar items or events of interest for some question or experiment
- Stellar population, categorized groups of stars within the Milky Way
- World population, total number of living humans on Earth

== See also ==
- Demography, the statistical study of human populations
- List of continents and continental subregions by population
- List of countries and dependencies by population
- People (disambiguation)
- Population density
