= Pop (train) =

Italian electric multiple unit

ETR 103/104/204/108
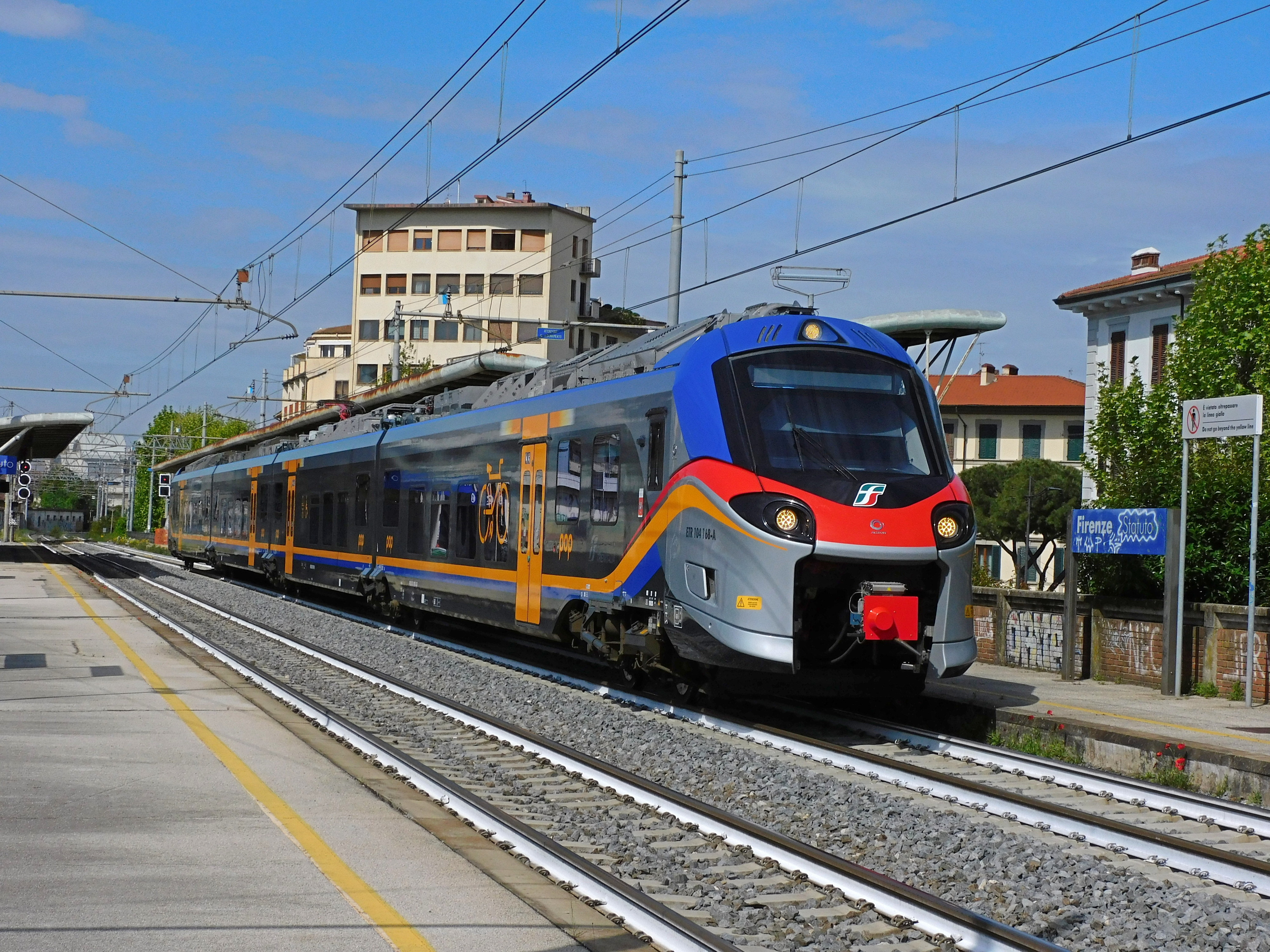
- An ETR 104 "Pop" unit of Trenitalia

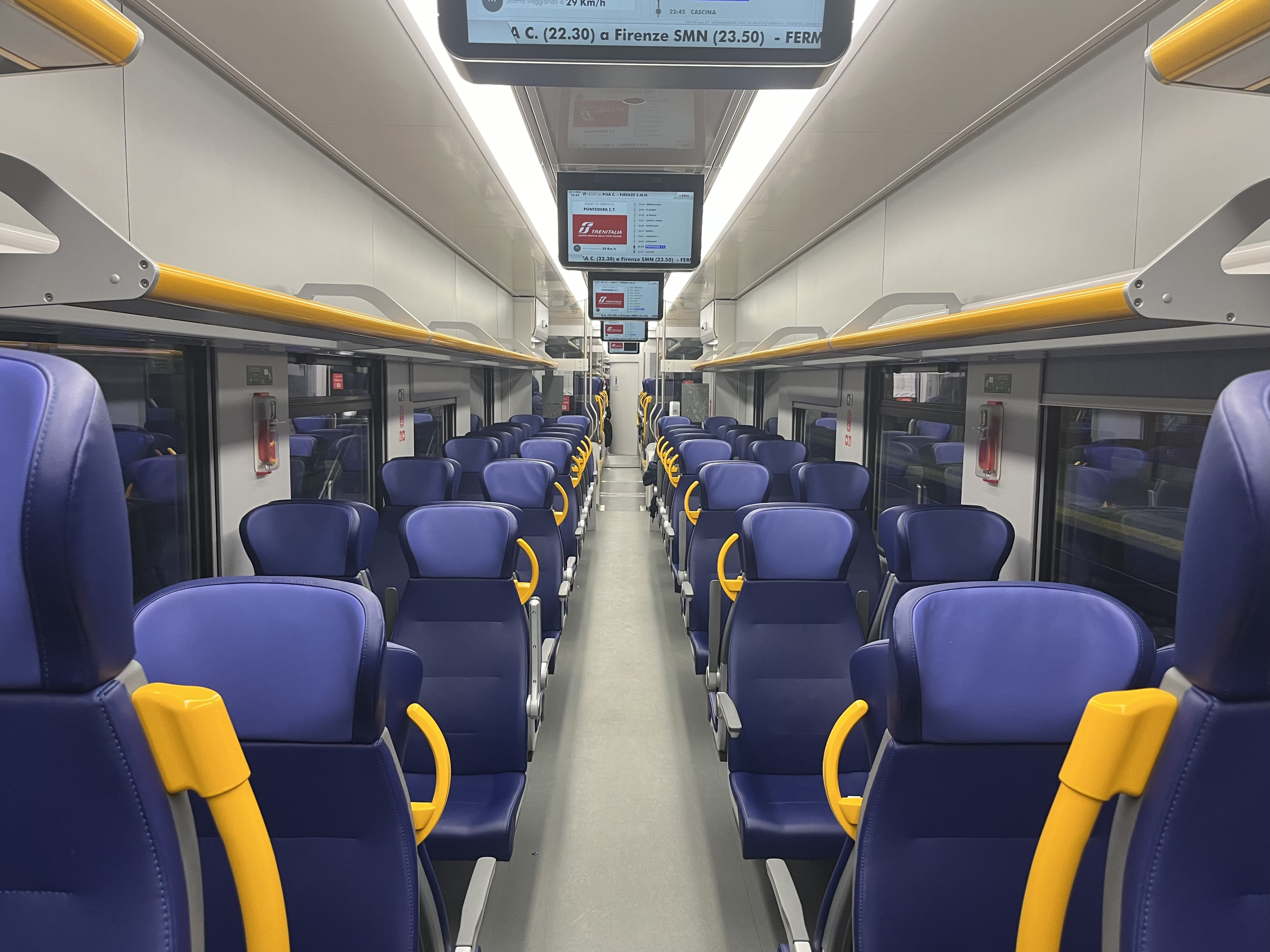
- Interior of an ETR 104 "Pop"
- Stock type: Electric multiple unit
- Manufacturer: Alstom Ferroviaria
- Assembly: Savigliano, Italy
- Family name: Coradia Stream
- Constructed: 2017-present
- Entered service: 2019 (ETR 103/ETR 104); 2020 (ETR 204); Expected 2026/27 (ETR 108)
- Formation: 3-car (M-T-M); 4-car (M-T-T-M); 8-car (M-T-T-T-T-T-T-M)
- Capacity: 384 passengers (ETR 103); 504 passengers (ETR 104/204)
- Operators: Trenitalia; Trenord; TUA; Ferrotramviaria; Trenitalia Tper; Ferrovie del Sud Est

Specifications
- Train length: 65.70 m (215 ft 6 5/8 in) (ETR 103); 84.20 m (276 ft 2 15/16 in) (ETR 104/204)
- Width: 2.82 m (9 ft 3 in)
- Height: 4.28 m (14 ft 1/2 in)
- Wheel diameter: 920 mm (36 in)
- Maximum speed: 160 km/h (99 mph); 200 km/h (120 mph) (ETR.108)
- Weight: 118.5 t (116.6 long tons; 130.6 short tons) (ETR 103); 143.5 t (141.2 long tons; 158.2 short tons) (ETR 104/204)
- Electric systems: 3,000 V DC from overhead catenary
- Current collection: Pantograph

The ETR 103, ETR 104, ETR 108, and ETR 204 are electric multiple units built by Alstom in Savigliano. They belong to the Coradia Stream family and are intended for the regional railway services of various Italian companies. It is used by many Italian railway companies; Trenitalia has most of this type of train in its fleet, other operators also use the trains such as Trenord, Tper, Ferrovie del Sud Est and Ferrotramviaria. All operators except Trenitalia use the Pop commercial name. Trenitalia retired the name in November 2024. Trenord still uses the nickname Donizetti for their ETR 204 trains.

== Overview ==
=== History ===
Alstom and Trenitalia made a framework agreement in August 2016 to manufacture 150 3-car and 4-car trains. Mock-ups were first shown in 2017 (alongside the related NS ICNG) and at InnoTrans in 2018. The ETR 103 and ETR 104 entered service in December 2019 with Trenitalia and the ETR.204 entered service with Trenord in 2020.

In April 2023 Alstom and Trenitalia made a framework agreement to modify existing frame contracts to manufacture a faster, 8-car train which will receive the ETR.108 designation.

In November 2024 the trains received a new Regionale paint scheme for the Trenitalia brand of the same name that was launched the month prior. The Pop name was retired with the introduction of the new scheme.

=== Livery design ===
==== Trenitalia ====
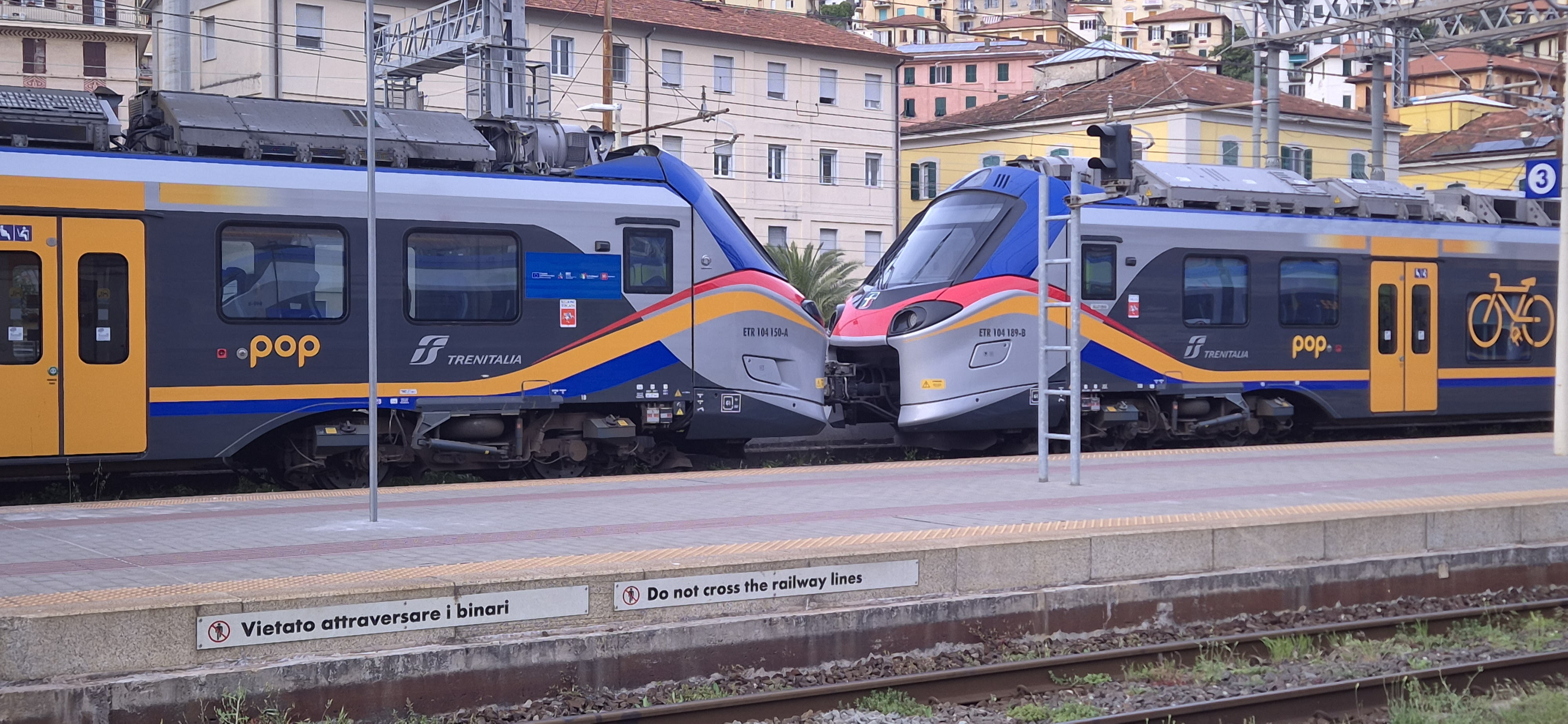
One of the "Pop" trains used by Trenitalia in Liguria at La Spezia Centrale.

Until November 2024 all Trenitalia units wore a light and dark grey livery with orange, red, and blue accents. The livery has since then been replaced by the new Regionale livery which combines multiple shades of green.

==== Trenord ====
The Trenord livery uses a green front end with most of the sides painted green, light blue, and white.

==== TUA ====
TUA units feature a similar livery to that of the Trenitalia units' old livery but with the blue paint being replaced with light green paint. TUA's units supply the operator's already existing Lupetto trains.

==== Ferrotramviaria ====
Ferrotramviaria units use a dark green, yellow, and white paint scheme.

== Features ==
In the 4-car configuration used by Trenitalia and all other operators except Trenord it is able to carry up to 509 passengers compared to only 384 in the 3-car version. The interior is modular and places where there are normally 4 seats can have luggage racks or snack machines installed.

The regional variant for Naples has a reduced seating capacity to increase the amount of luggage that the train can hold. This was also done to the ALe 724 trains that served in Naples.

The seats are all equipped with USB sockets and 230V electrical sockets. The on-board LED lighting adjusts automatically based on the amount of ambient light present, and the large windows allow for a greater entry of natural light. Passenger circulation is optimized thanks to wide corridors compliant with UIC567 regulation and suitable for people with reduced mobility.

The on-board information system is integrated with the ground infrastructure of each individual operator and is equipped with LCD displays in the carriages visible from every point of the train, which display travel information and/or audiovisual entertainment content. There is a Wi-Fi network accessible to passengers and on-board staff. Travel information is also displayed on the yellow LED monitors at the ends and sides of the vehicle. Safety is guaranteed by a system of digital video surveillance cameras, with images displayed on the monitors, and by an automatic fire suppression system. A passenger counting system allows for monitoring the number of people on board.

== Operators ==
Many Trenitalia subsidiaries such as Tper and Ferrovie del Sud Est operate the Pop trains. Other companies such as TFT also use these trains.

== Alternate variants ==
=== ETR 204 ===
A version of the ETR 104 used exclusively by Trenord. Compared to the Trenitalia units it has 2 bathrooms instead of just 1 and also has a 1st class section. These trains go by the Donizetti nickname.

=== ETR 108 ===
A longer, faster 8-car version of the ETR 104 being developed exclusively for Trenitalia for usage in the Umbria region. Testing for these units began in March 2025. The first ETR 108 unit was presented on September 30, 2025.
