= Alstom Avelia =

Alstom Avelia is a family of trainsets for high-speed rail services built by Alstom. The family includes the following models:

- Avelia Euroduplex
- Avelia Horizon
- Avelia Liberty
- Avelia Pendolino
- Avelia Stream
