= Virgin Trains (open-access operator) =

Prospective open-access operator

- Franchise: Open-access operator
- Parent company: Virgin Group

Virgin Trains is a prospective open-access operator proposing to operate services on the West Coast Main Line between London, Birmingham, Liverpool, Rochdale and Glasgow, as well as on the High Speed 1 between London, Kent, and Paris, Brussels, and Amsterdam via the Channel Tunnel.

== Background ==
In March 1997 as part of the privatisation of British Rail, the Virgin Rail Group commenced operating the InterCity West Coast franchise on the West Coast Main Line (WCML) from London Euston to destinations including Birmingham, Manchester, Liverpool and Glasgow. Virgin also took over the CrossCountry franchise that operated across the United Kingdom including services on the WCML from Birmingham to Manchester, Liverpool, Glasgow and Edinburgh.

In November 2007, the CrossCountry franchise was taken over by Arriva CrossCountry after being retendered. As part of a restructure of the franchise map by the Department for Transport, in December 2007 the CrossCountry services that operated to Glasgow and Edinburgh via the WCML were transferred to the InterCity West Coast franchise.

In December 2019, the West Coast franchise was taken over by Avanti West Coast after being retendered.

== 2019 proposal ==
After losing the West Coast franchise, in 2019 Virgin announced that it proposed to seek paths from the Office of Rail & Road (ORR) to operate services from London Euston to Liverpool as an open-access operator with InterCity 225 sets that were due to be released from the InterCity East Coast franchise.

== 2024 proposal ==
In May 2024, Virgin announced it had lodged an application with the ORR to operate services on the WCML from London Euston to Birmingham, Liverpool, Rochdale and Glasgow from December 2025. Services would initially be operated by former Avanti West Coast Class 221 Bombardier Voyagers, before electric multiple units would be purchased after infrastructure upgrades. The application was rejected in July 2025 due to insufficient capacity on the rail network.

== Virgin Trains Europe ==
In October 2024, Virgin Trains Europe (VTE) applied to the ORR for access to Temple Mills Depot, intending to operate services from London St Pancras via the High Speed 1 line and Channel Tunnel to Paris, Brussels and Amsterdam.

In August 2025, VTE signed a letter of intent with Alstom for 12 Avelia Stream trains.

In October 2025, the ORR granted VTE access to Temple Mills Depot. In August 2026, the ORR granted VTE track access rights to High Speed 1 to run up to 20 return services daily. The agreement is to run from 1 October 2030 until 31 December 2040. Eurostar Group has appealed the ORR's decision. In October 2026, VTE ordered 12 Avelia Stream trainsets from Alstom for cross-channel services, expected to start in 2030.

Commencement of the services is contingent on access agreements being agreed with Getlink, SNCF Réseau, Infrabel and ProRail.
