= Avelia Liberty =

High-speed train from Alstom for North America

Avelia Liberty NextGen Acela
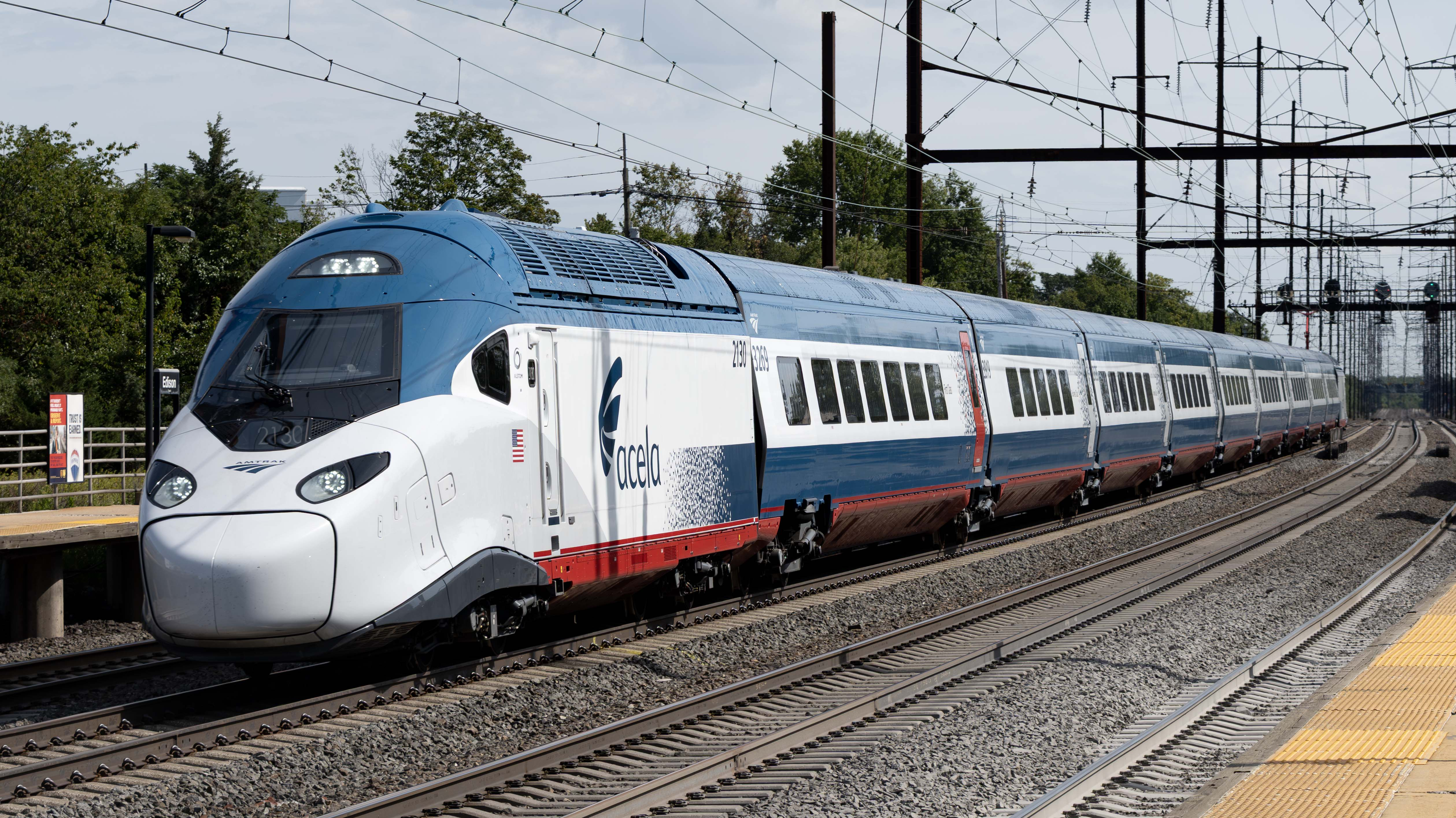
- NextGen Acela in Edison, New Jersey, on its inaugural trip in August 2025

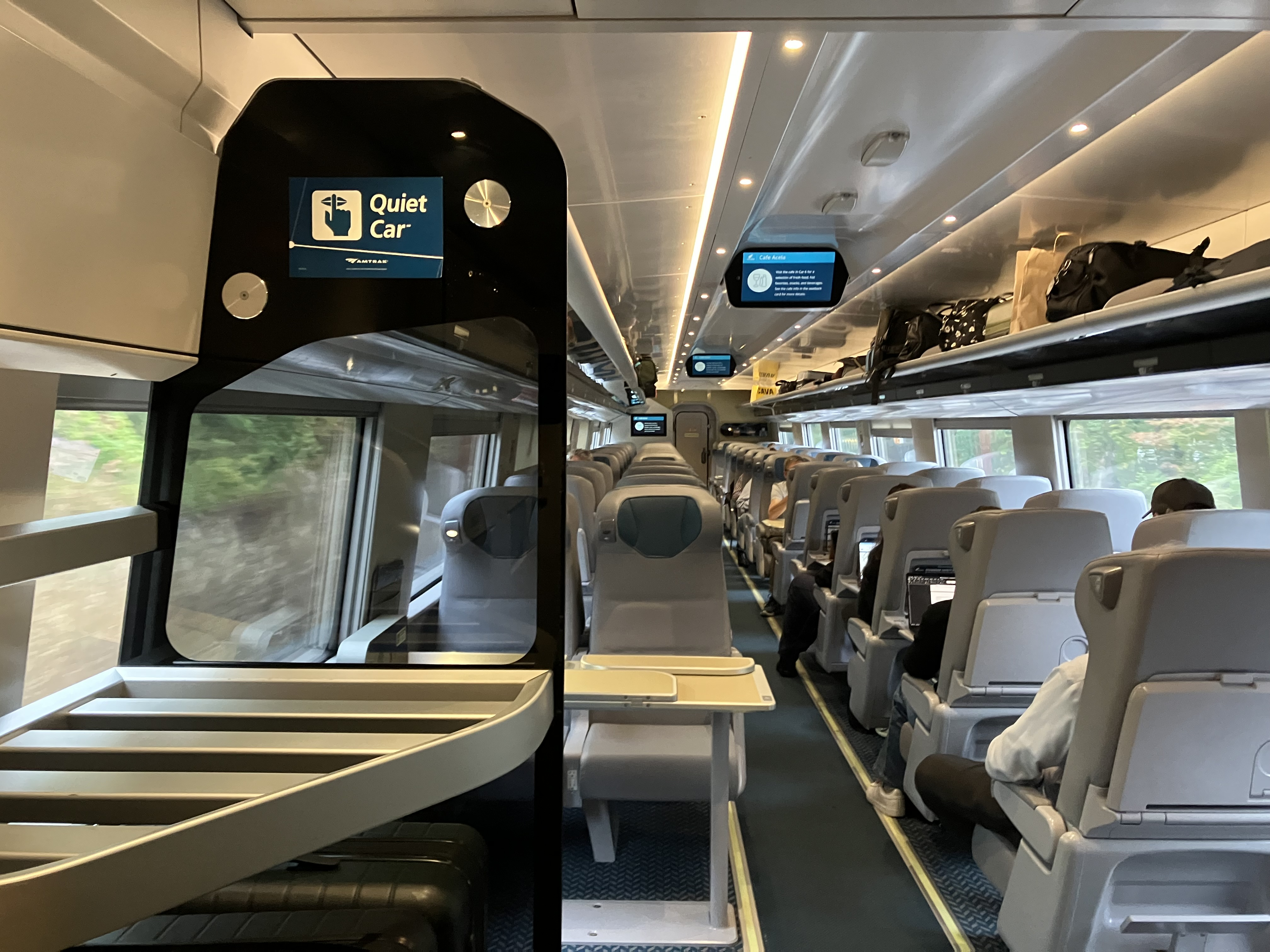
- Interior of the quiet car
- Stock type: High-speed trainset
- In service: 2025 – present
- Manufacturer: Alstom
- Built at: Hornell, New York
- Family name: Avelia
- Constructed: 2017–present
- Entered service: August 28, 2025
- Number under construction: 28 trainsets
- Number in service: 16
- Predecessor: Acela Express
- Formation: 11 cars (2 power cars, 9 passenger cars)
- Capacity: 386
- Operator: Amtrak
- Depots: Ivy City, Washington, D.C.; Penn Coach Yard, Philadelphia; Sunnyside Yard, New York City; Southampton Street Yard, Boston

Specifications
- Car body construction: Power car: carbon steel Passenger coach: aluminum
- Train length: 698.23 ft (212.82 m)
- Maximum speed: Service: 160 mph (257 km/h); Design (with tilting): 186 mph (300 km/h)
- Weight: 499.1 short tons (452,800 kg) empty, 533 short tons (484,000 kg) full seated
- Axle load: 17 tons
- Traction system: IGBT
- Power output: 9,516 hp (7,096 kW) total
- Electric systems: Overhead line: 25 kV 60 Hz AC; 12.5 kV 60 Hz AC; 12 kV 25 Hz AC
- Current collection: Pantograph
- Braking systems: Power cars: dynamic and regenerative; Passenger cars: electro-pneumatic, disk and tread
- Coupling system: Type-10
- Track gauge: 4 ft 8 1/2 in (1,435 mm) standard gauge

Notes/references
- Specifications

Avelia Liberty, marketed by Amtrak as the NextGen Acela and previously referred to as Acela II during the procurement phase, is a tilting high-speed passenger trainset built for the North American market by French manufacturer Alstom and assembled in the United States. Amtrak has ordered 28 trainsets for use on its flagship Acela service along the Northeast Corridor between Boston, New York, and Washington, promising higher capacity and greater speeds than the first-generation Acela trainset.

Part of Alstom's Avelia family of high-speed trains, the Avelia Liberty is adapted for Federal Railroad Administration Tier III crashworthiness standards and other North American requirements.

Trains began testing in 2020, with a planned entry into service for 2022. After several delays, the first five trainsets entered passenger service on August 28, 2025, and as of August 2026, 16 of the total order of 28 trainsets have entered service.

== History ==
In 2000, Amtrak introduced the Acela service along the Northeast Corridor between Boston and Washington, D.C., via New York City and Philadelphia. The service uses a dedicated Acela Express trainset that was built by a consortium of Alstom and Bombardier between 1998 and 2001.

20 original Acela Express trainsets were purchased, of which 17 were deployed daily on the weekday pre-COVID schedule. The capacity eventually proved to be insufficient, and Amtrak looked at ways to expand capacity. Adding cars to lengthen existing Acela trainsets was initially looked into, and a lengthened Acela trainset was tested in 2011, but after discussions with Bombardier, manufacturing additional Acela cars was deemed uneconomical. Bombardier was also unwilling to manufacture additional original Acela trainsets. Amtrak decided to acquire newer, more modern trainsets, and developed a specification from 2012 to 2013. A request for proposal was issued in July 2014.

In August 2016, Amtrak announced a $2.4 billion loan from the United States Department of Transportation for the purchase of new high-speed trainsets for the Acela service from Alstom. Alstom will also provide long-term technical support and supply spare components and parts. These next generation trainsets would replace the 20 existing trainsets that were nearing the end of their useful service life. The 28 trainsets ordered would allow for more frequent service on the Northeast Corridor, including half-hourly peak service between New York City and Washington, D.C.

=== Construction and testing ===
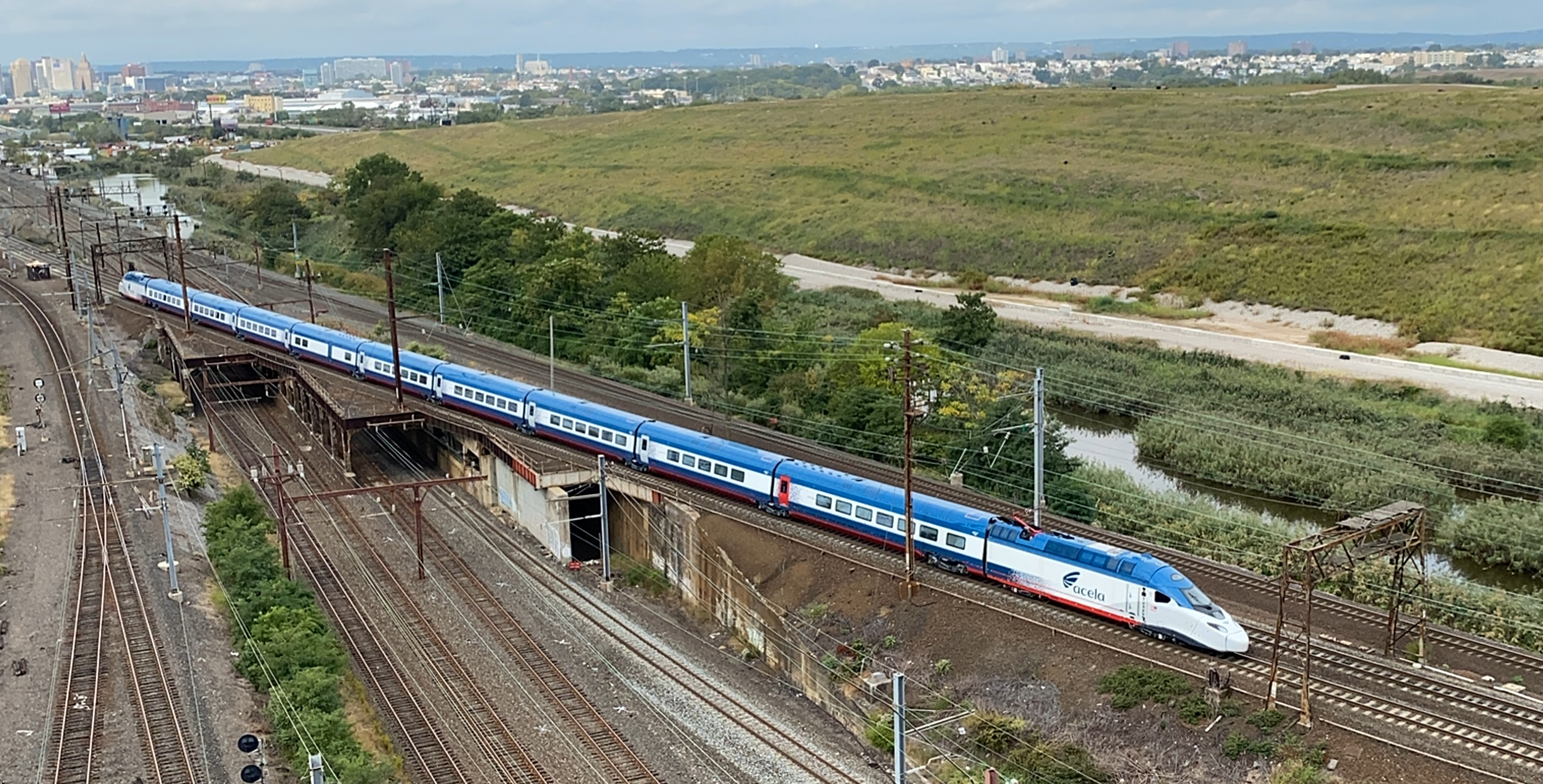
The second trainset on the Sawtooth Bridges in Kearny, New Jersey, during testing in 2020

U.S. assembly of the trainsets is taking place at Alstom's plants in Hornell and Rochester, New York, with parts supplied by over 180 companies in 29 states. Initial construction of car bodies and major components began at Hornell in October 2017. The first prototype set was sent to the Transportation Technology Center (TTC) in Pueblo, Colorado in February 2020 for testing on the high-speed test track. During the nine months of expected trials, the trainsets were tested at speeds up to 165 mph (266 km/h). A second prototype was delivered in March 2020 to Amtrak for testing along the service tracks in the Northeast which began in May 2020. The first test run up to Boston South Station occurred on September 28, 2020.

By 2020, the first trainset was expected to enter revenue service in early 2022, with all trainsets in service by late 2022, at which point Amtrak would retire the previous Acela fleet. By February 2022, full high-speed testing was not expected to begin until later that year. In May 2022, 15 of the 28 trainsets were in "some phase of production".

Testing at up to 165 miles per hour (266 km/h) took place in 2022. As of May 2023, the first trainsets were expected to enter revenue service in 2024, three years behind schedule. Testing has revealed incompatibility issues due to the lack of tracks built to accommodate high-speed trains—Acela shares tracks with commuter lines and freight lines—and the age of infrastructure in the Northeast, some of which dates back almost two centuries.

In October 2023, a report from the Amtrak Office of Inspector General disclosed that the Avelia Liberty would likely go into service in the second half of 2024. The report cited several previously undisclosed issues with the trainsets, including spontaneously shattering window glass on some trains.

On January 13, 2024, Amtrak announced that after thirteen previous failures, the Avelia Liberty had passed a series of computer simulations of running the trains over the Northeast Corridor tracks. Having passed the simulation, the trainsets were approved by the Federal Railroad Administration for on-track testing between Washington and Boston. By December 2024, 14 of the 28 trainsets had been delivered and revenue service was expected to begin in spring 2025. The first five trainsets entered service on August 28, 2025. Its top speed during commercial service is around 160 miles per hour (260 km/h).

== Features and production ==
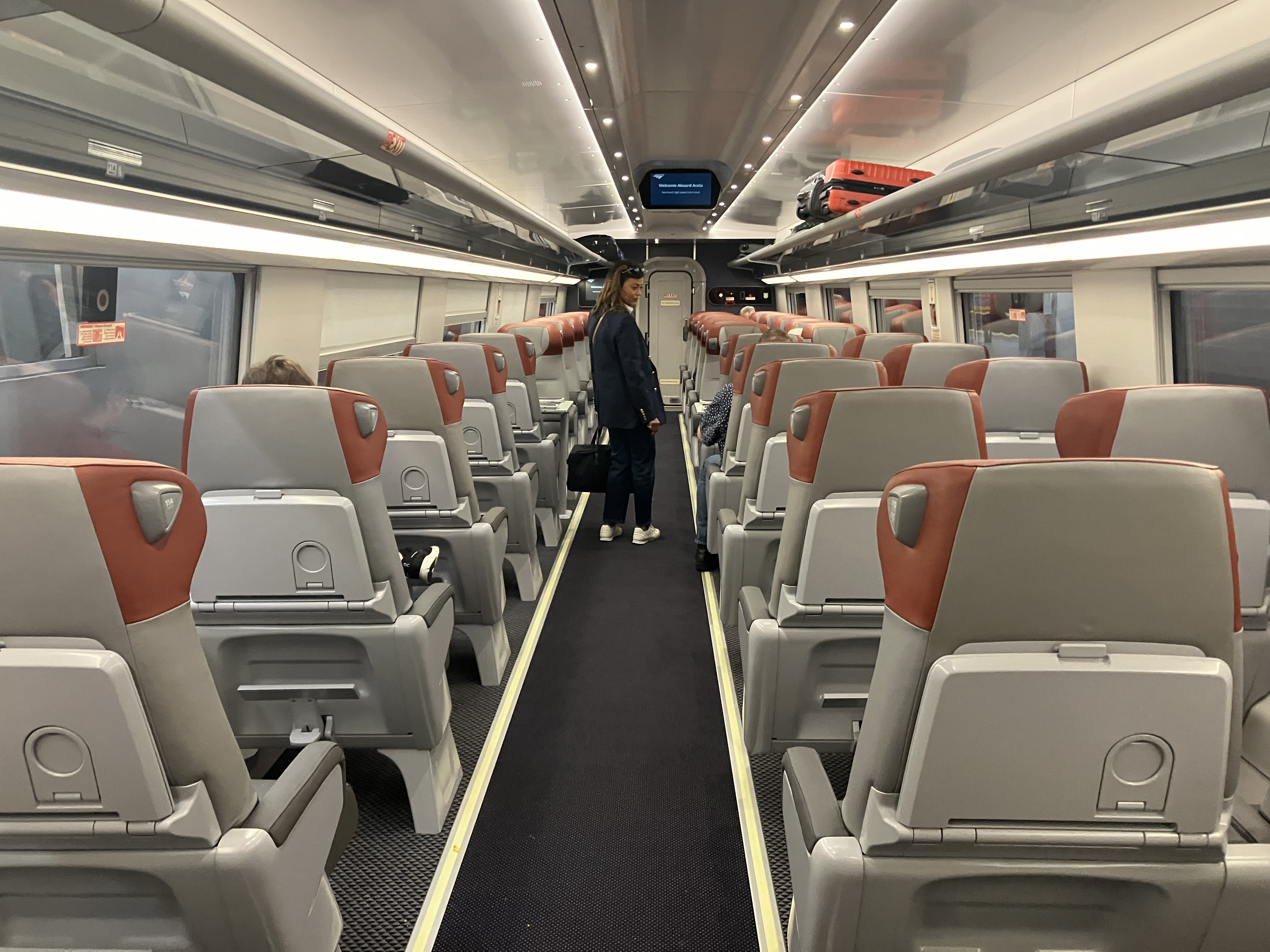
First-class seats aboard the Avelia Liberty

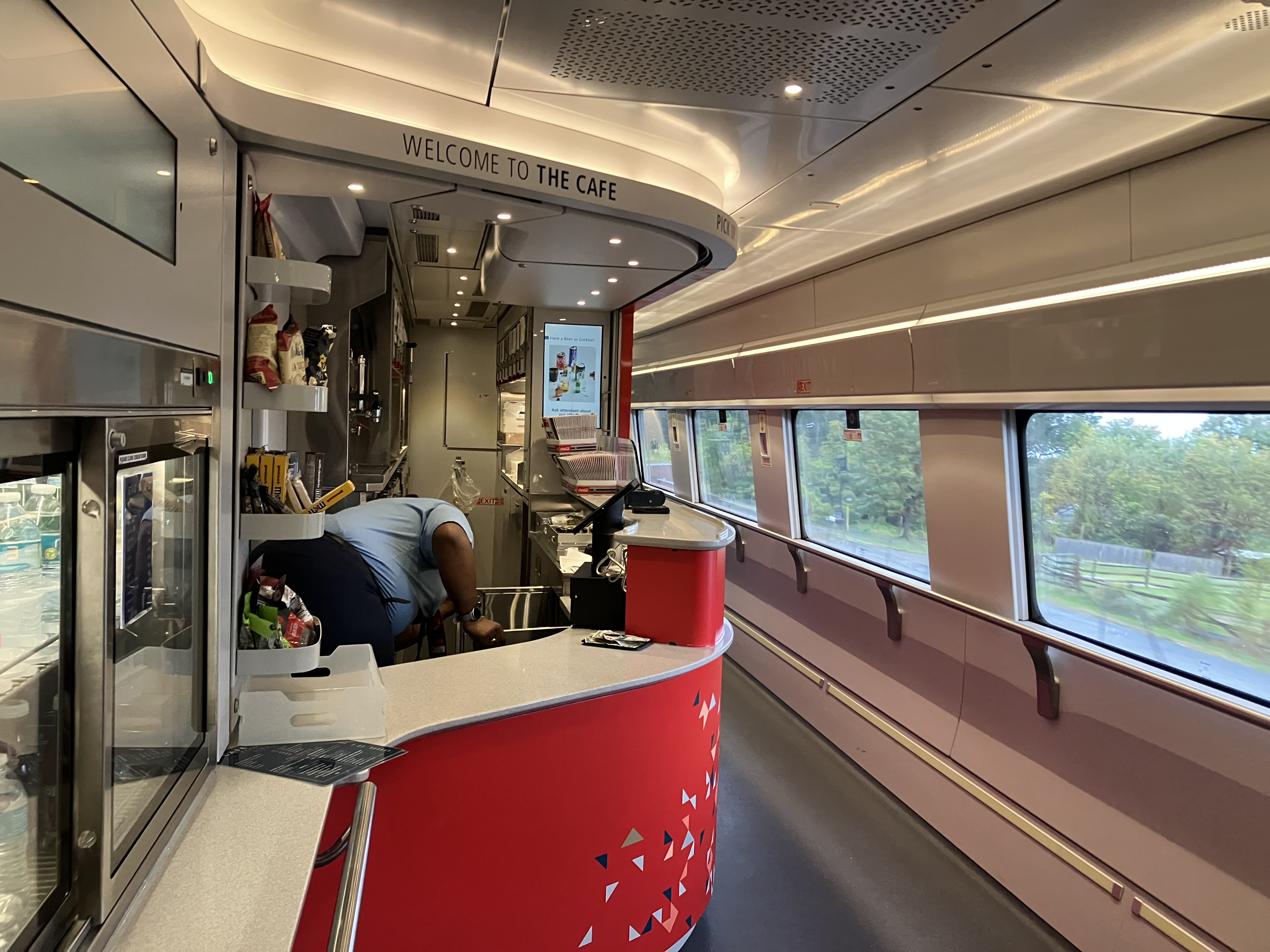
Cafe car

Although Amtrak initially favored a New Pendolino derivative, the trainset trailers are based on the AGV and the power car design is based on that of the Avelia Horizon, designed for the French high-speed rail network (TGV), but adapted to conform with North American railroad standards, including the U.S. Federal Railroad Administration (FRA)'s Tier III crashworthiness standards.

Compared to the prior generation, the new fleet will have more trainsets, each of which has 378 seats and 8 wheelchair locations for a total capacity of 386 passengers, allowing for 25% greater passenger capacity per trainset. They will be equipped with an active tilt system, dubbed Tiltronix by Alstom and based on Pendolinos, that will allow higher speeds on curved portions of the corridor track at a maximum tilt angle of 6.3°.

Each Avelia Liberty trainset has power cars at each end of the train, and (initially) nine articulated passenger cars. An additional three-passenger cars can be added if demand grows. The power cars include a crash energy management system to help meet the FRA's Tier III standards while allowing a 30 percent reduction in train weight. These trains will also have USB ports, power sockets, Wi-Fi, accessibility features, touchless bathroom facilities, trip information displays, a café car, improved HVAC, audio and visual announcements in every rail car, and other conveniences. Train rides are reportedly smoother than the previous generation.

The new trainsets, along with track and signaling improvements, will allow for an initial improvement in maximum regular service speed to 160 miles per hour (260 km/h) on portions of the route previously cleared for 150 mph (240 km/h) operations. Many infrastructure upgrades are underway or completed, allowing for more frequent service and faster speeds.

=== Formation ===
Each trainset consists of two power cars, one at each end, and nine passenger cars. The passenger cars include a 43-seat First Class end car; a 39-seat Business Class car with a galley for attendants serving First Class passengers; three 49-seat Business Class cars; a Café (food service) car; two additional 49-seat Business Class cars; and a 59-seat Business Class end car designated as a quiet car. There are a total of 386 seats per trainset.

Car no.		1	2	3	4	5	6	7	8	9		Total
Designation	Power	First Class	First Class Galley/Business Class	Business Class			Café	Business Class		Business Class (quiet car)	Power	—
Capacity	—	43	39	49	49	49	—	49	49	59	—	386

== See also ==
- Alstom Avelia Horizon, a French bilevel high-speed train manufactured by Alstom
- Pendolino, a European family of high-speed tilting trains, currently manufactured by Alstom
- High-speed rail in the United States
