= New Pendolino =

Italian high-speed tilting train

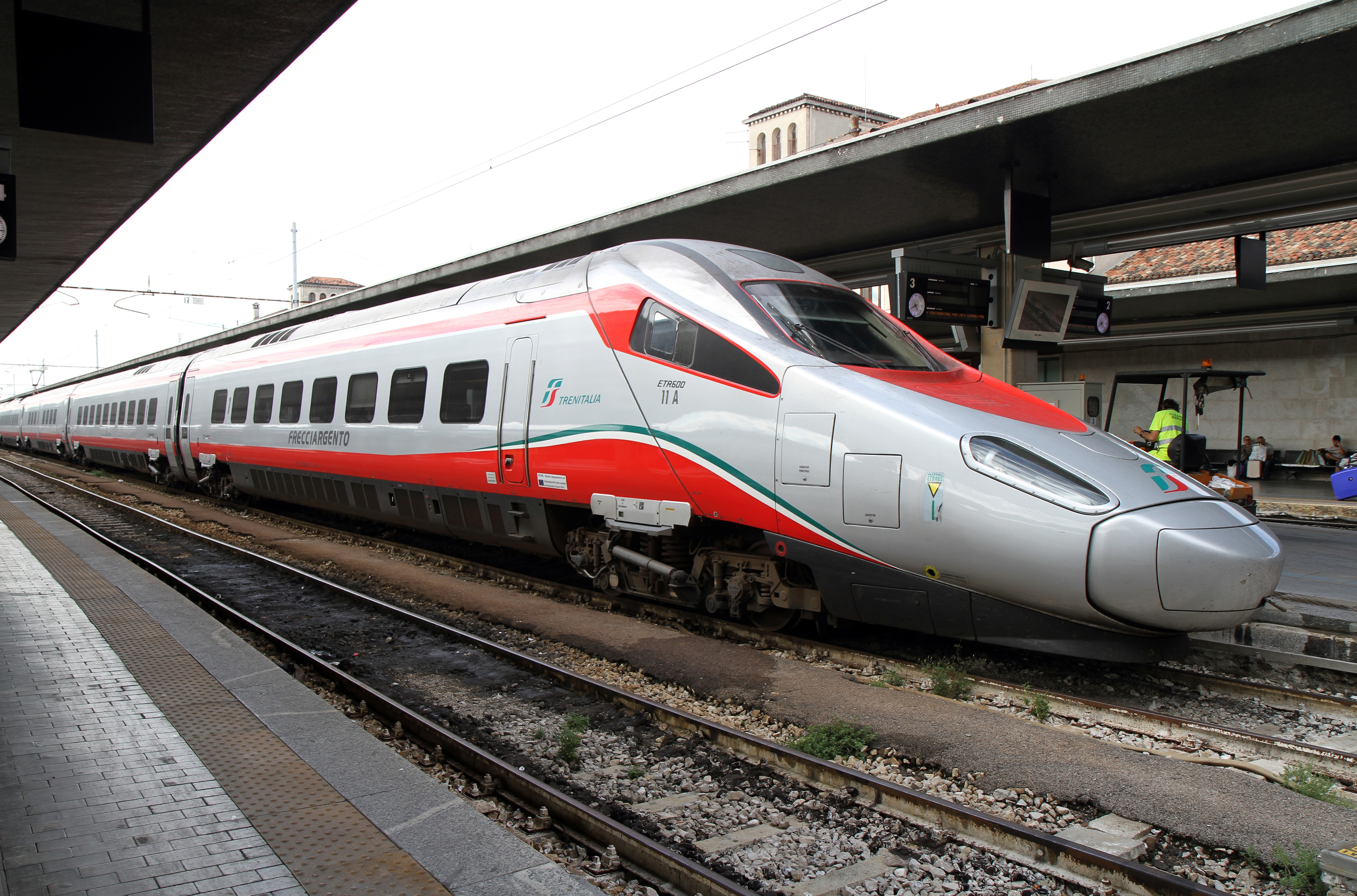
- ETR600 at Venezia Santa Lucia railway station
- Manufacturer: Alstom
- Built at: Savigliano (ITA)
- Family name: Avelia Stream
- Constructed: 2006–present
- Entered service: 2008
- Number built: 93 sets
- Formation: 7 cars (4 with motors, 3 trailers)
- Capacity: 430 + 2 wheelchairs

Specifications
- Train length: 187.4 m (614 ft 10 in)
- Car length: 26.2 m (85 ft 11 1/2 in)
- Width: 2.83 m (9 ft 3 3/8 in)
- Maximum speed: Service: 250 km/h (155 mph); Record: 293 km/h (182 mph)
- Weight: Empty: 387 t (853,000 lb); Loaded: 421 t (928,000 lb)
- Axle load: 16.5 t (36,000 lb) with passengers
- Power output: 5,500 kW (7,376 hp)
- Electric systems: Overhead line: 3 kV DC; 25 kV 50 Hz AC; 15 kV 16 2/3 Hz AC (ETR 610)
- Current collection: Pantograph
- Track gauge: 1,435 mm (4 ft 8 1/2 in) standard gauge

The New Pendolino is a class of high-speed tilting trains built by Alstom Ferroviaria (Fiat Ferroviaria) for Trenitalia and Cisalpino.

As of 2024, Pendolinos have become a part of the Avelia Stream high speed train family.

== Operational history ==
=== Background ===
The name Pendolino is used to identify a family of high-speed, tilting-technology trains, produced in Italy. These trains owe their name (pendolino can mean "small pendulum" in Italian) to the mechanism enabling them to tilt when going around a curve. The maximum tilt of 8 degrees allows the trains to reach a speed that is up to 35% higher than conventional trains whilst remaining comfortable for passengers. Developed by Alstom Ferroviaria, which inherited tilting technology (including that of the British Advanced Passenger Train) after its acquisition of former producer Fiat Ferroviaria, they are built at Alstom's Savigliano plants, in Piedmont, as well as in Sesto San Giovanni near Milan (which supplies the traction converters).

The Pendolino first began service in Italy in 1988, with model ETR 450, followed by ETR 460, ETR 470 and ETR 480. A new model generation was launched in 2006 with ETR 600 for Trenitalia and ETR 610 / RABe 503 for Cisalpino, a railway company that operated trains between Switzerland and Italy. Manufacturer Alstom labeled them as New Pendolino.

=== ETR 600-610 (Italy) / RABe 503 (Switzerland) ===
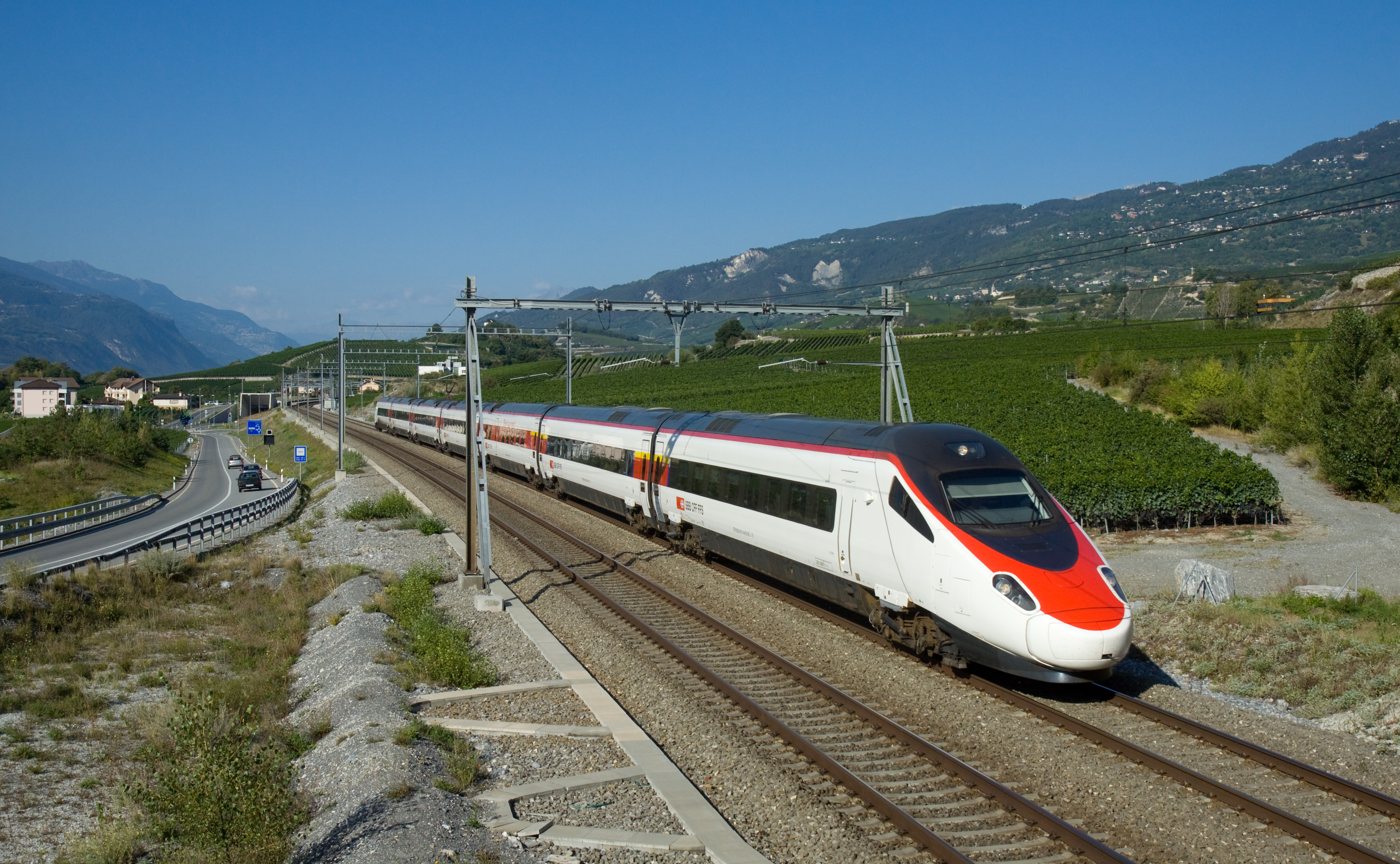
An SBB ETR 610 in Valais

The ETR 610 / RABe 503 (also known as the Cisalpino Due as it was the second class of tilting trains used by Cisalpino) primarily differs from the ETR 600 in the sense that the ETR 610 / RABe 503 supports the voltage and signalling systems used in Switzerland and Germany. This includes the need for much heavier on-board traction power transformers necessary as a result of the lower traction power frequency of 16.7 Hz used in Switzerland, Austria and Germany in comparison with those required for the 25 kV 50 Hz AC traction power supplies. The innovative features concern the interior and exterior design, now closer to the customers’ brand strategy and an improved comfort and services for passengers. Moreover, some important technical characteristics have been increased, such as the power of the traction unit and the level of redundancy of components and equipment, in order to improve reliability. The new trains will be produced in full accordance with the new regulations governing interoperability (for example, passive security in case of impact).

Initial testing of the type revealed some shortcomings, perhaps the most significant of which was that the type was too heavy for the main Gotthard route from Zurich to Milan for which they had been ordered. In fact, the ETR 610's weight impacted the train's permitted cornering speed due to forces exerted upon the track that it compelled a lower-than-expected operating speed; it was determined that the new trains would have to run so slowly that traditional trains that lacked tilting systems would be just as fast, and thus some officials publicly questioned the project's value. The original intended schedule for the type's introduction was to coincide with the December 2007 timetable change, together with the opening of the Lötschberg Base Tunnel; however, it was deferred and rescheduled for spring 2009, this date was also missed. During August 2009, the ETR 610 fleet finally achieved sufficient progress as to permit it to enter revenue service. The train is run on international routes between Switzerland and Italy; it is also used to conduct a single daily trip from Frankfurt (Main) Hauptbahnhof to Milano Centrale via the Gotthard Base Tunnel and back via Simplon Tunnel and Lötschberg Base Tunnel to Frankfurt.

In 2018, the fleet was rebranded as Astoro following a refurbishment. In January 2023, the SBB announced a SFr 120 m ($US 131.2m) investment in an extensive refurbishment of the ETR 610 fleet to facilitate its continued operation for a further 15 years. The program involves renewing and replacing various components and systems, repainting the vehicle bodies, and making minor accessibility improvements in compliance with Swiss federal disabilities legislation.

=== ED250 (Poland) ===
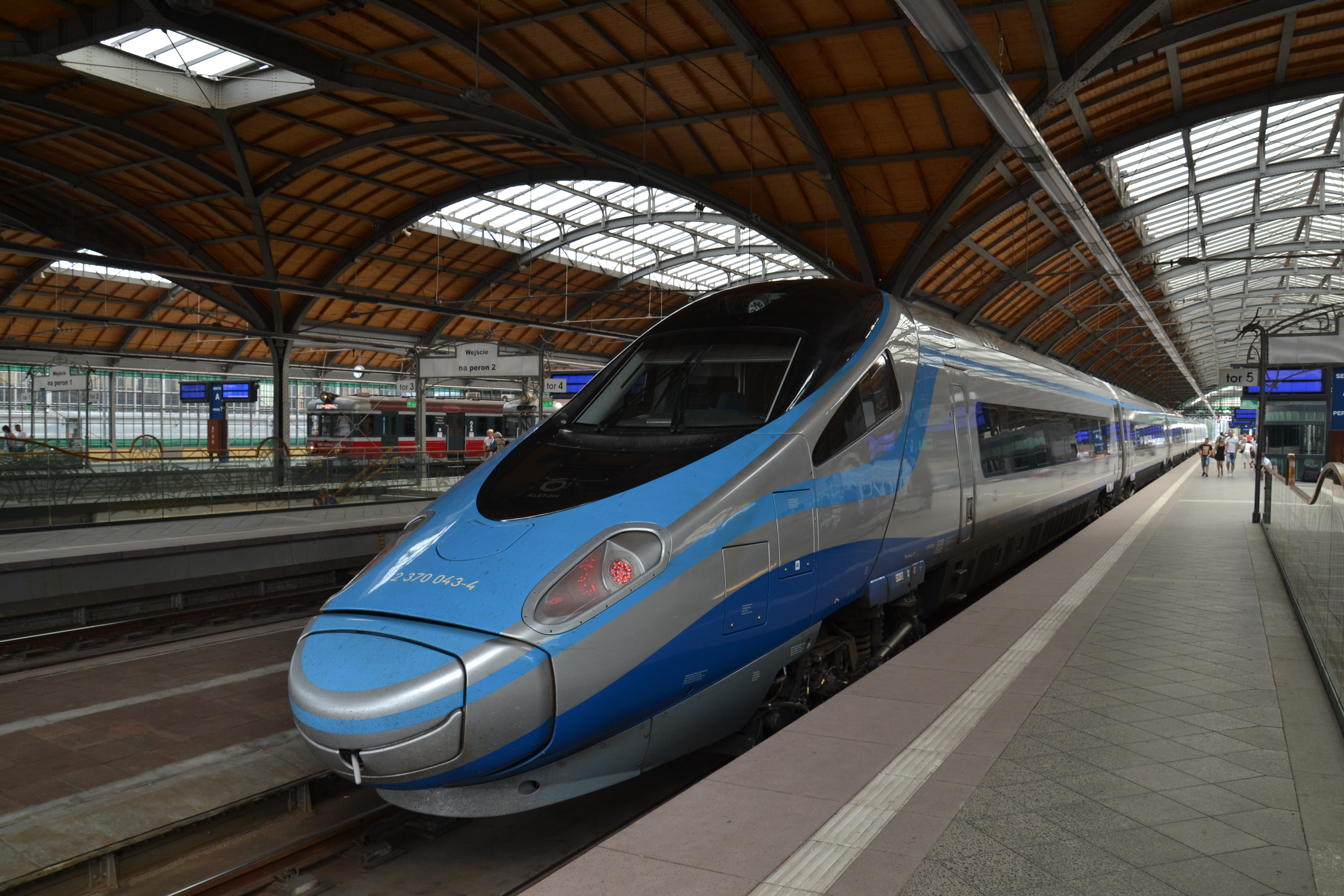
ED250 at Wrocław Główny

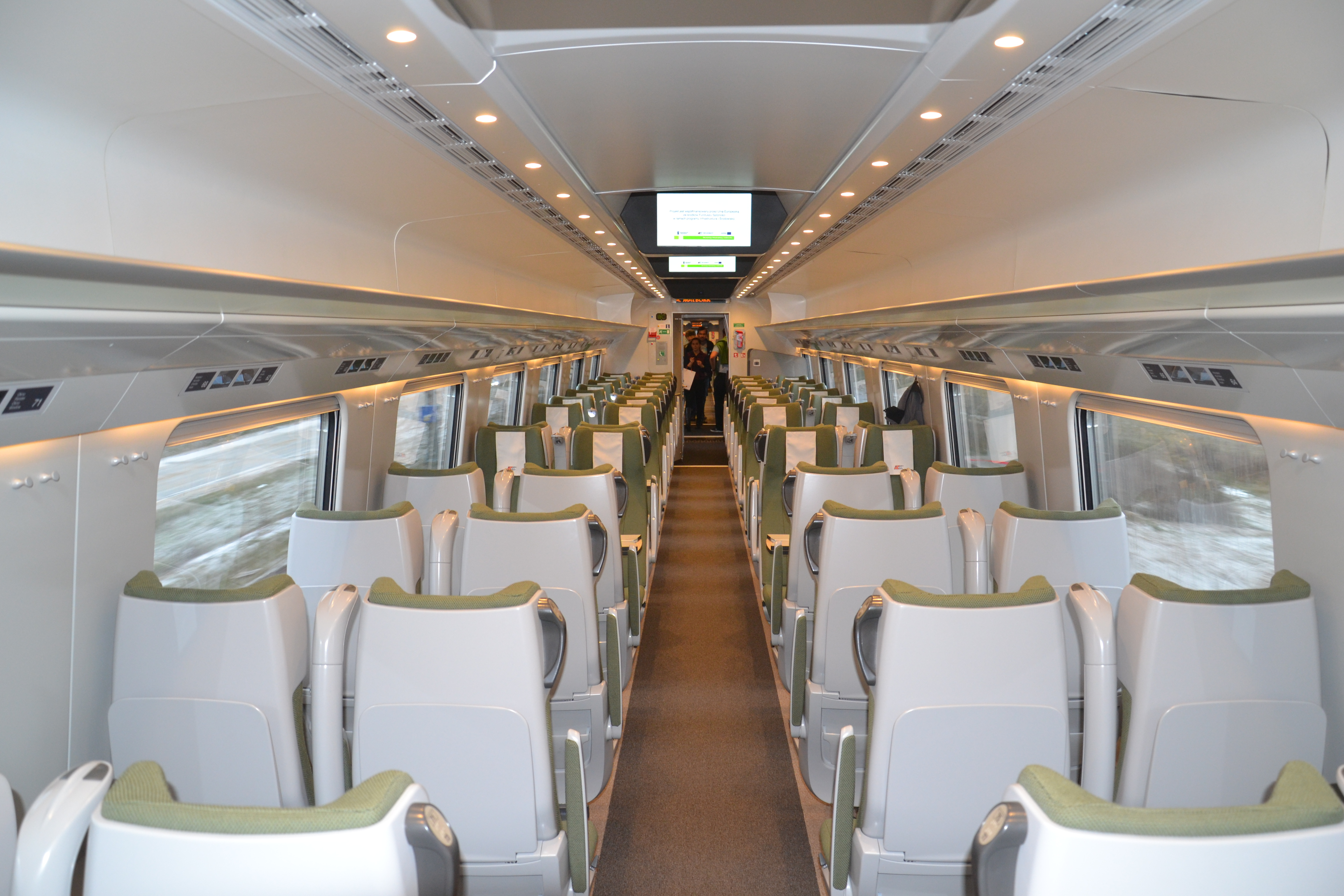
Second class ED250 interior

On 30 May 2011 the Polish state railways PKP signed an agreement with Alstom for 20 ETR 610 Pendolinos. These new trains, referred to as Pendolino ED250, were procured with the intent of operating them several major trunk routes, including between Gdynia and Warsaw, on the high-speed CMK Central Rail Line from Kraków/Katowice to Warsaw and Wrocław to Warsaw. On 12 August 2013, the first ETR 610 was delivered.

High speed tests involving the new trainset were largely conducted on the CMK Central Rail Line; on 16 November, the first day of testing, the Pendolino reached 242 km/h (150 mph). On 17 November 2013, a new speed record for Polish railways was set when the Pendolino ED250 reached a speed of 291 km/h (181 mph), breaking the previous record of 250.1 km/h (155.4 mph) set 19 years prior. On 24 November 2013, the final day of tests on the CMK Central Rail Line, the Pendolino reached 293 km/h (182 mph).

The contract between the Polish operator PKP Intercity and Alstom called for the first eight Pendolino ED250 trainsets to be delivered on 6 May 2014, tested ('certified') for operation at 250 km/h (155 mph) using ETCS L2 signalling. These tests had not been performed by May, and PKP announced that Alstom had failed to meet the contract terms and would be charged penalties as of May 6. Alstom responded that homologation in Poland at 250 km/h (155 mph) using ETCS Level 2 was impossible, since ETCS Level 2 was not operational anywhere in Poland, and the Central Rail Line (where the first ED250 Pendolino had reached 293 km/h (182 mph) in testing) was equipped with ETCS Level 1, not Level 2. On 26 June 2014, a compromise was reached between PKP and Alstom under which the Pendolinos would be delivered under a two-stage homologation, first homologated for operation using ETCS Level 1 and eventually to be homologated for ETCS Level 2. Hopes were expressed that the Pendolinos could be in service by 14 December 2014.

On 11 September 2014, Polands's Railway Transport Office (UTK) announced that the ED250 had been certified for operation at up to 250 km/h (155 mph) in accordance with the relevant Technical Specifications for Interoperability (TSI). In the 2020–21 timetable, ED250 routinely operated at a scheduled speed of up to 200 km/h (124 mph) along selected stretches of the Warszawa – Gdynia and Central Rail Line routes. Polish Pendolino trainsets do not have tilting mechanism which precludes them from the main advantage of faster taking of curves. In 2020, one train did derail in Germany during an instrumented test run.

=== Avant S-114 (Spain) ===
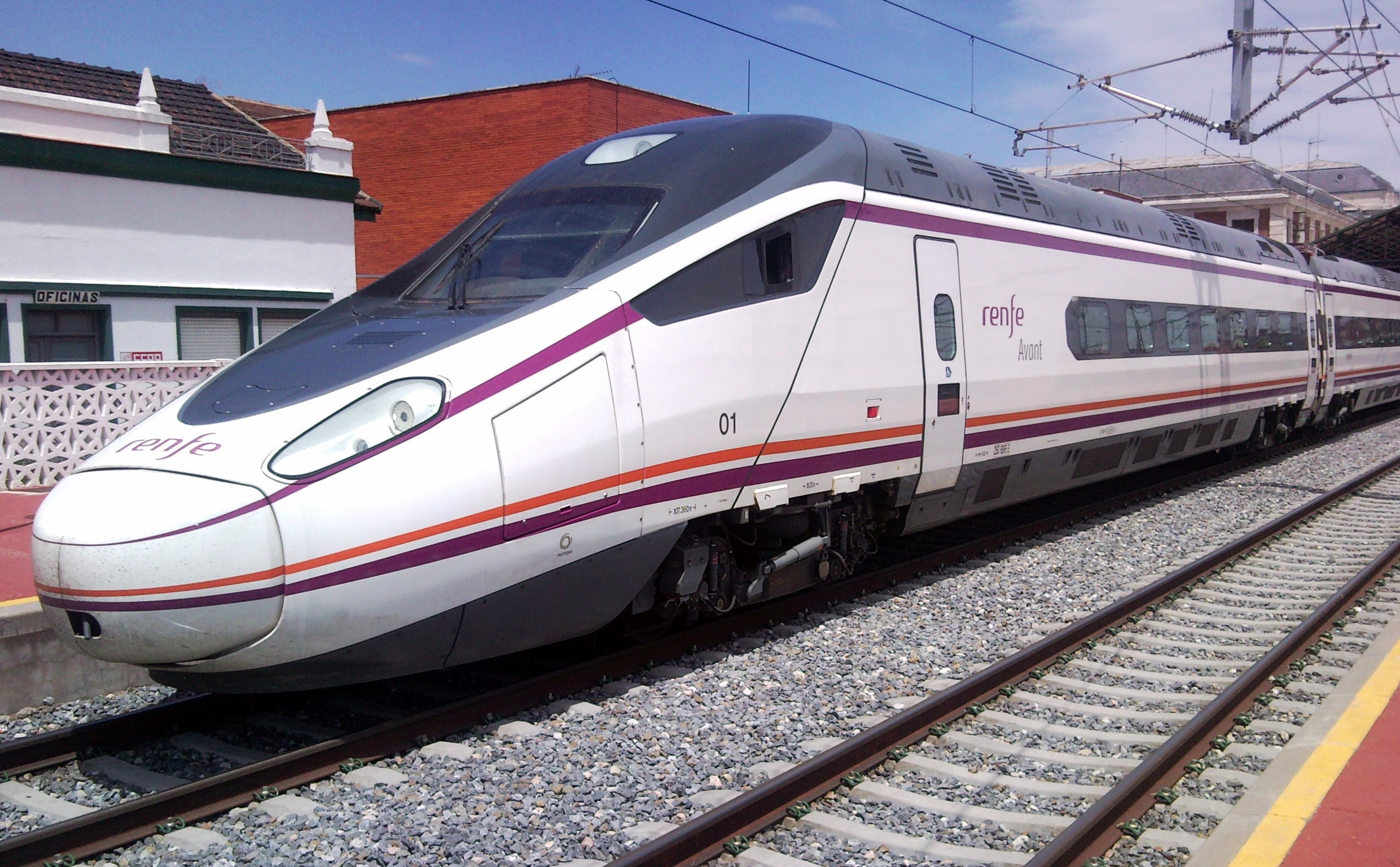
A Renfe Avant S-114 train at Valladolid-Campo Grande

The Avant S-114, locally designated as the RENFE Class 114, is a four-car variant of the New Pendolino series. During October 2004, it was announced that RENFE had placed an order for 30 high-speed trains, configured for medium distance routes and thus lacking tilting mechanisms. The order, which was subsequently reduced to thirteen trainsets, supplemented the operator's older fleet of Class 104 Pendolinos.

In autumn 2008, the first train of the new class was formally presented. The RENFE has operated its S-114 fleet on its high-speed services between Madrid, Segovia, and Valladolid, along the high-speed line.

=== ETR 675 (Italy) ===
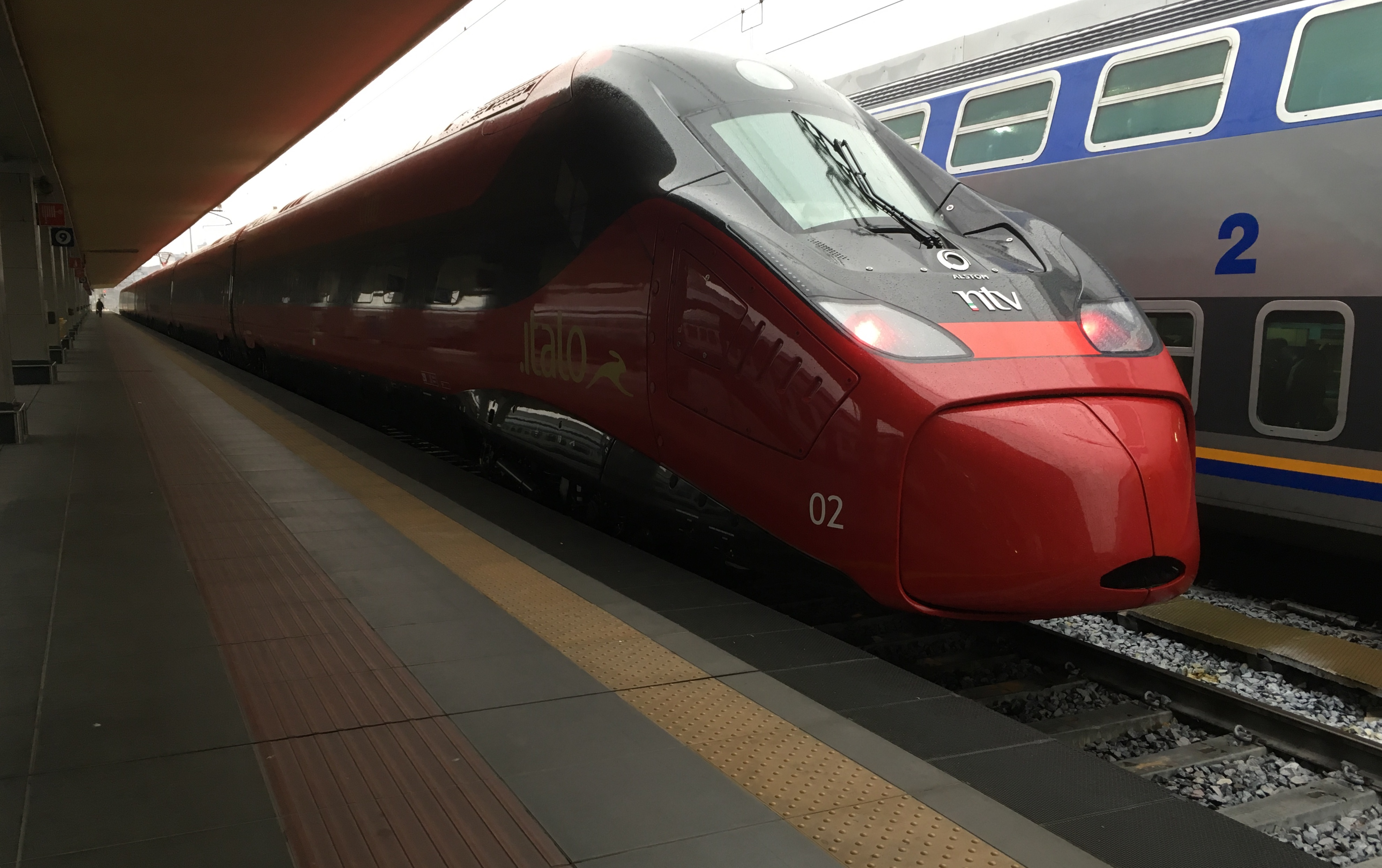
ETR 675 NTV in Torino Porta Nuova railway station

The Pendolino EVO ETR 675 operated by the open-access high-speed operator Nuovo Trasporto Viaggiatori (NTV), is a member of the Avelia family of Alstom, which also includes other rolling stock produced and operated across various different countries. The ETR 675, akin to the model operated by PKP, is not equipped with tilting apparatus. The name Pendolino, however, evidently remains as a brand for trains that can be structured both with and without oscillation.

In October 2015, NTV announced that it would be procuring an initial batch of twelve ETR 675 trainsets as part of its efforts to expand its fleet via a contract valued at €460m. In comparison with the operator's preceding fleet of Automotrice à grande vitesse (AGV) trainsets, the new train's maximum speed was approximately 50 km/h (31 mph) slower; the new fleet was reportedly intended to facilitate NTV's expansion of its Italo services, as well as to introduce services to new destinations. On 3 October 2013, the first of NTV's Pendolinos was publicly presented at the Expo Ferroviaria exhibition in Milan; by this point, the type was undergoing certification trials ahead of operating regular revenue service. In November 2017, NTV announced that it was exercising an option to purchase an additional five trainsets.

On 7 December 2017, the first four out of NTV's 17 ETR 675 trains entered service on its route between Rome and Venice, enabling the operator to was increase the number of daily services on its network from 56 to 68. The introduction of the rest of the fleet saw service frequencies being further increased across 2018 to 90 trains per day.

=== CRH5A (China) ===
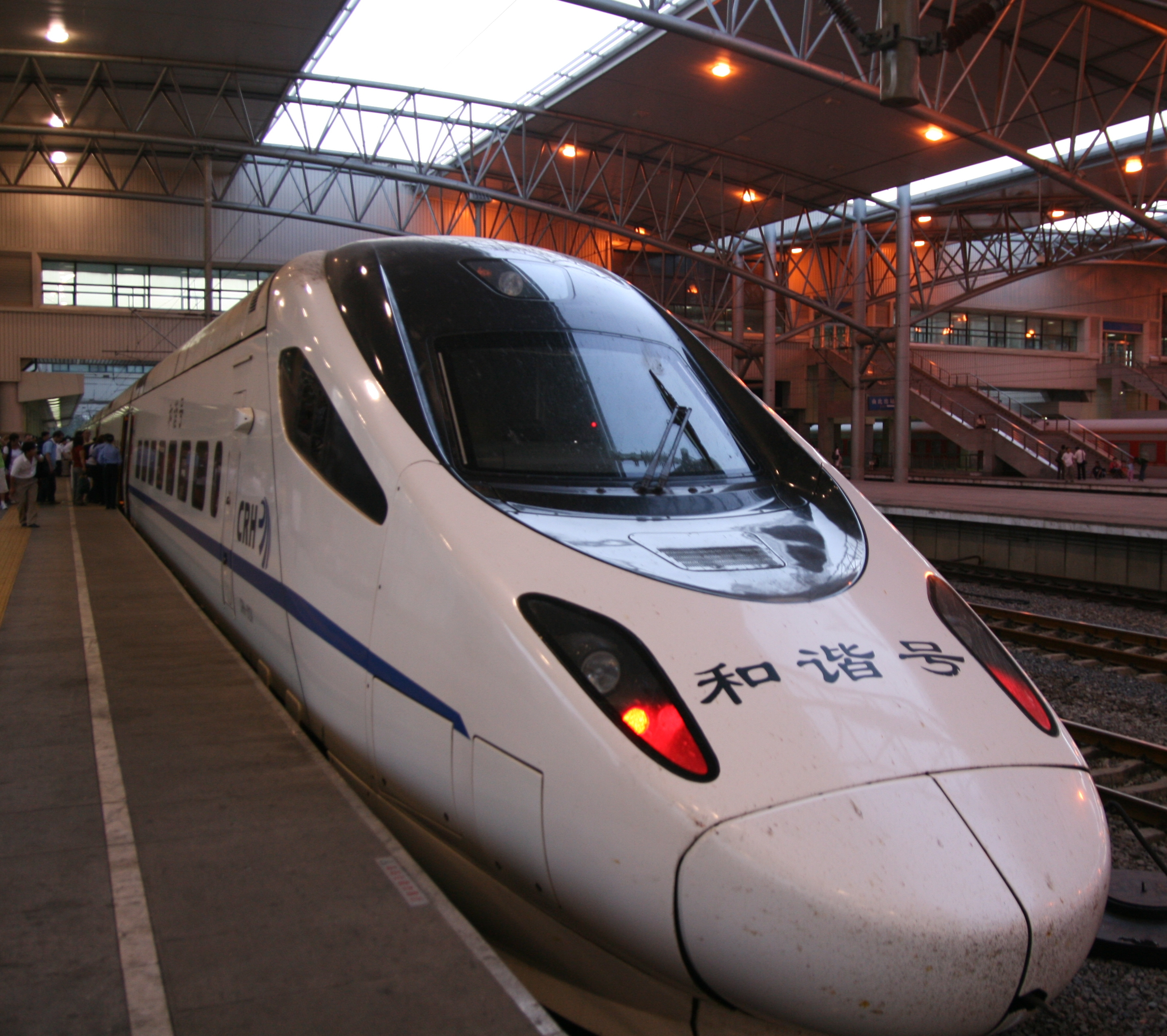
CRH5A in Shenyang

China Railway High-speed (CRH) purchased technologies from Alstom to assemble 60 sets of high speed EMU trains, which have been named CRH5 and are based on the New Pendolino trains. The CRH5 are non-tilting trains. 30 additional sets were ordered in 2009 and 20 additional sets was ordered in 2010 to complete the current fleet operating on China's northern and eastern lines.

== Technical characteristics ==
The trains have the following characteristics:

- Seven cars: four with motors and three trailers
- Gauge: 1,435 mm (4 ft 8 1/2 in)
- Voltage:
  - ETR 600 (Trenitalia): 3 kV DC, 25 kV 50 Hz AC
  - ETR 610 (Trenitalia and Swiss Federal Railways): 3 kV DC, 25 kV 50 Hz AC, 15 kV 16 2/3 Hz AC
- Length of coach: 26.2 metres (85 ft 11 in)
  - Total length of coach: 28.2 metres (92 ft 6 in)
- Total length of train: 187.4 metres (614 ft 10 in)
- Width: 2.83 metres (9 ft 3 in)
- Weight: 387 tonnes (853,000 lb)
- Maximum load per axle with passengers: 16.5 tonnes (36,000 lb)
- Total weight under normal load (with passengers): 421 tonnes (928,000 lb)
- Maximum speed: 250 km/h (155 mph)
- Total installed power: 5,500 kW (7,376 hp)
- Seating: 430 + 2 for wheelchair users
- Tilting actuating system: electro-hydraulic
- HVAC system with built-in redundancy

Many of the new Pendolinos have been fitted with the European Train Control System (ETCS) Level 2 signalling system; some operations, such as the Swiss Federal Railway (ETR 610) have installed other signalling systems such as SCMT, ZUB, LZB, and Integra-Signum, in order to operate over lines not equipped with ETCS.

== See also ==
- Pendolino
- Avelia Liberty
- List of high speed trains
- China Railways CRH5, a non tilting New Pendolino
- Avant class 114, a non tilting New Pendolino
