= Avelia Horizon =

High-speed train type made by Alstom

TGV M Avelia Horizon
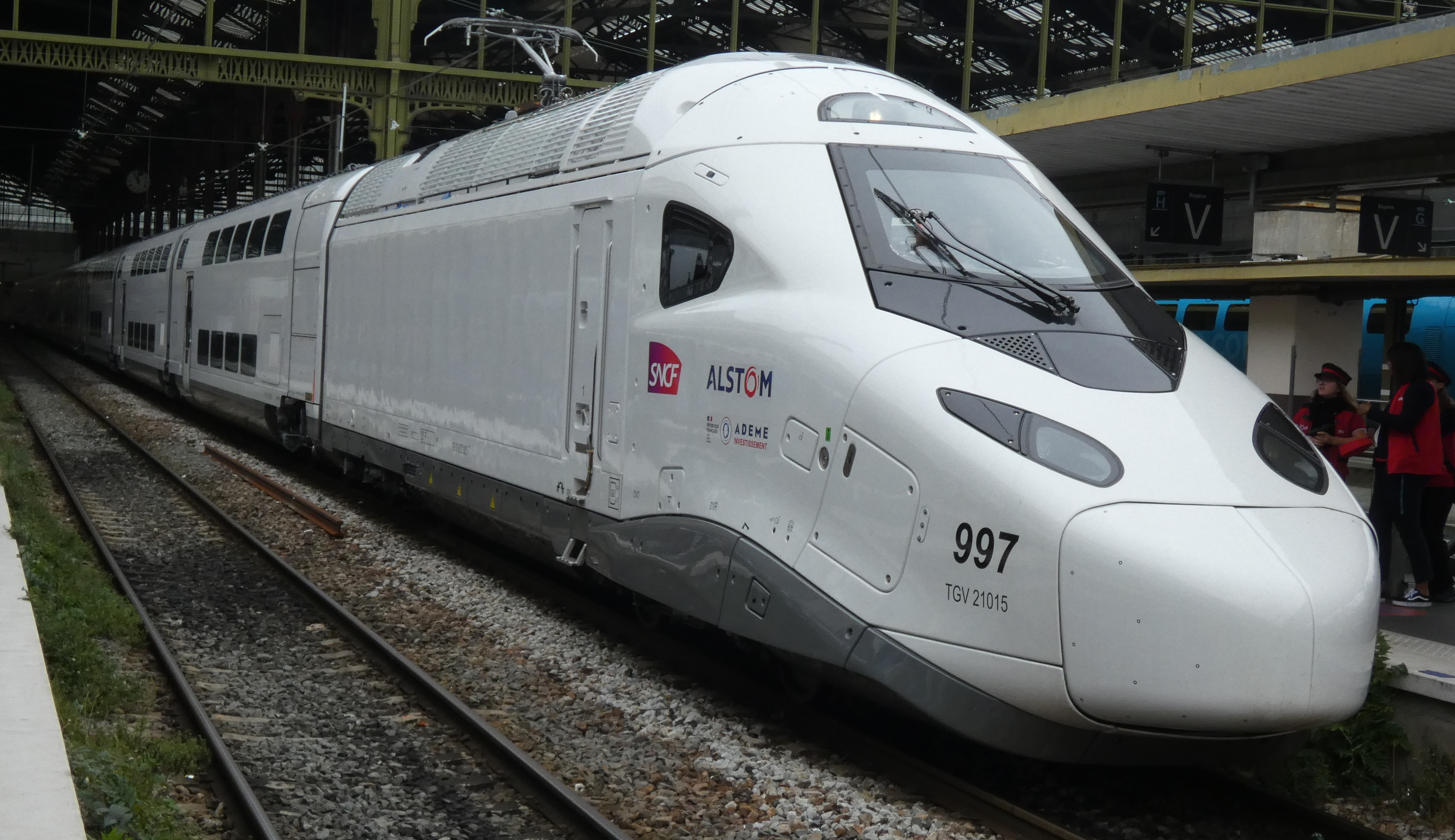
- Avelia Horizon TGV M 997 in Gare de Lyon station
- In service: 2026–present
- Manufacturer: Alstom
- Built at: La Rochelle (Aytré) / Belfort
- Family name: Avelia
- Constructed: 2020–
- Number under construction: 130 (SNCF Voyageurs); 12 (Proxima); 18 (ONCF); 30 (Eurostar)
- Formation: 2 power cars + 7-9 passenger cars
- Operators: SNCF Voyageurs; Proxima; ONCF; Eurostar

Specifications
- Car body construction: Aluminium
- Train length: Up to 202 m (663 ft)
- Width: 2.9 or 3.2 m (9.5 or 10.5 ft)
- Height: 4.32 or 4.7 m (14.2 or 15.4 ft)
- Floor height: ~430 mm (17 in)
- Platform height: 127–550 mm (5.0–21.7 in)
- Maximum speed: Service: 320 km/h (200 mph); Design: 350 km/h (217 mph)
- Traction system: Alstom IGBT–VVVF
- Power output: 7.8 MW (10,500 hp)
- Transmission: AC-DC-AC
- Electric systems: Overhead line: 25 kV 50 Hz AC; 15 kV 16.7 Hz AC; 1,500 V DC; 3,000 V DC
- Current collection: Pantograph, 2 per power car
- UIC classification: Bo′Bo′+2′(2)′(2)′(2)′(2)′(2)′(2)′((2)′((2)′))2′+Bo′Bo′
- Braking systems: Dynamic and regenerative (power cars); Electro-pneumatic disc and tread (trainset)
- Safety systems: ETCS, TVM, KVB
- Track gauge: 1,435 mm (4 ft 8 1/2 in) standard gauge

The Avelia Horizon, called TGV M ("M" for modular) by its main customer, SNCF Voyageurs, is a high-speed passenger train designed and produced by Alstom. It has a broadly similar design to the TGV Duplex sets, with double-decker coaches and a top and tail configuration with a power car on either end. However, it is more energy efficient and provides lower operating costs.

Development of the TGV M originated with SNCF Mobilités's launch of a program to procure a new generation of high-speed trains in 2015. In May 2016, the Alstom-headed Speedinnov joint venture was selected as the winning bidder for the program; on 7 September 2016, SNCF and Alstom signed an agreement to design and build the new trains. In July 2018, SNCF Mobilités placed an initial €2.7 billion order for 100 Avelia Horizon trainsets. Production of the first bodyshells commenced in mid-2020; two years later, dynamic testing was underway. In August 2022, SNCF Voyageurs announced that it had exercised an option for 15 additional quad-current Avelia Horizon trainsets for international services valued at €590 million. In January 2026, SNCF Voyageurs exercised a further option for 15 additional quad-current trainsets for services to Brussels, valued at approximately €600 million.

The TGV M has entered passenger service with the French train operator SNCF Voyageurs in TGV service on 6 November 2026; deliveries will continue into the 2030s. In 2023, SNCF Voyageurs labelled the train as TGV InOui 2025. Versions of the Avelia Horizon have also been ordered by French private operator Proxima, Morocco's national railway operator ONCF, and Eurostar.

== History ==
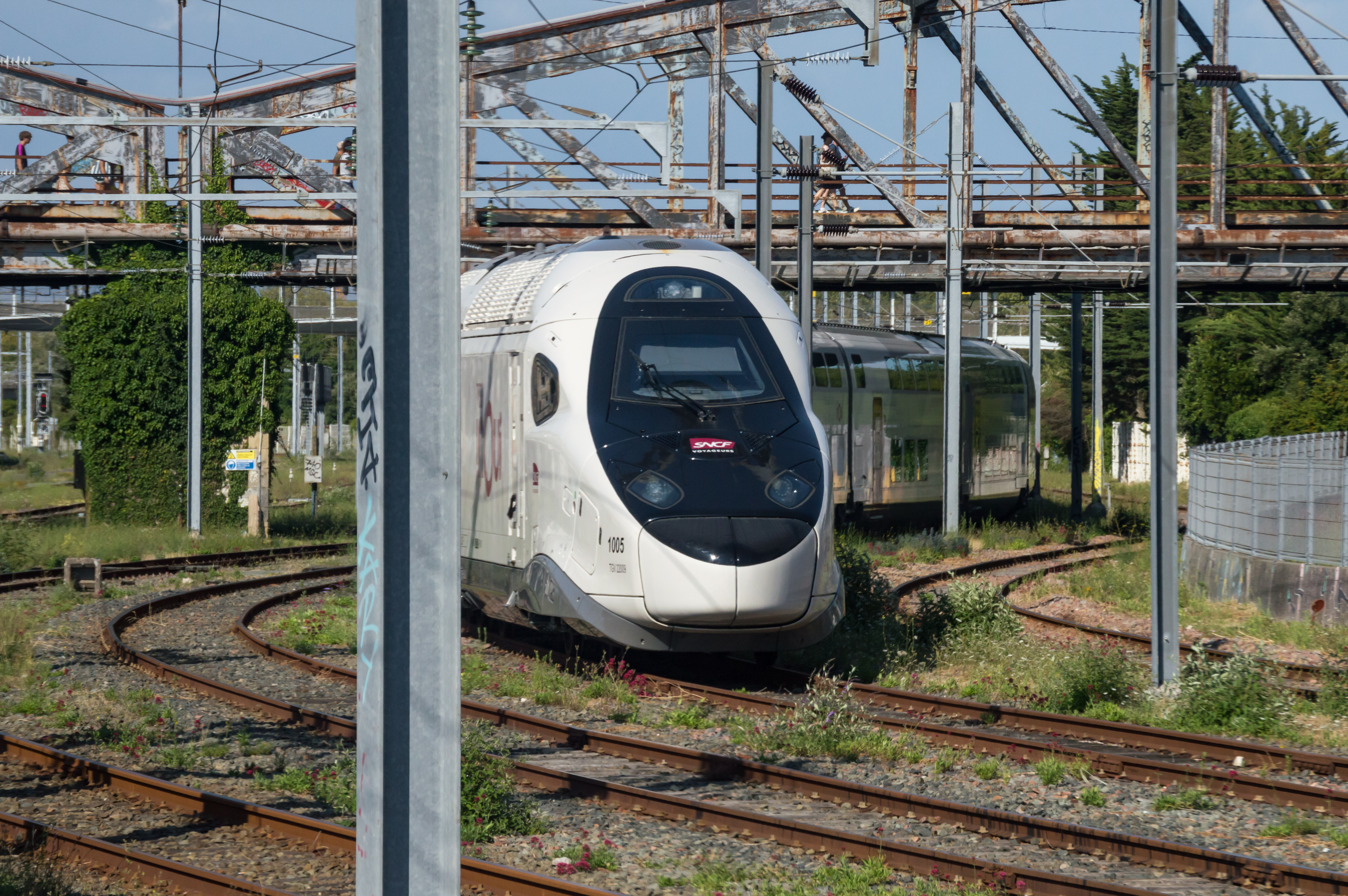
TGV M unit 1005 seen near Gare de La Rochelle

=== SNCF Voyageurs ===
In 2015, SNCF Mobilités launched a program to select a supplier for a new generation of high-speed trainsets, to be designed as a joint venture with the manufacturer. Amongst its requirements, SNCF Mobilités specified that the new trains be at least 20% less expensive to purchase than their predecessors while possessing lower operating costs as well. Planners were reportedly keen to minimize the lifetime costs of rolling stock so that cheaper tickets could be offered.

Around this time, the profitability of France's railway was under pressure from a combination of budget airlines, car sharing, and long-distance bus operators; in response, the French government was proactive in its efforts to reorient long-distance travelers towards its railways. Additional support for the program came via the European Commission's Europe 2020 strategy. The French government agency Ademe partnered with the rolling stock manufacturer Alstom to form the SpeedInnov joint venture, which submitted a bid for the SNCF's program. The submission was for a new train that would be one part of a broader family of high-speed equipment that Alstom would pursue the sales of globally; this philosophy was a significant shift from that of all previous TGV orders, which had involving rolling stock being built specifically to suit the French market. Alongside new technology, many existing features from the company's prior high-speed trains were also reused.

SpeedInnov was selected as the winning bid, enabling work to commence in May 2016. On 7 September 2016, SNCF Mobilités and Alstom signed an agreement to design and build the trains, with the design phase scheduled to be complete by the end of 2017 and an entry into service in 2022. Thereafter, an 18 month development period was undertaken. During this time, the new trainset's design was defined after examining various conceptual arrangements; various recent innovations were also evaluated for their potential inclusion, the benefits and cost of such inclusions being individually discussed in detail with SNCF.

By July 2018, the design was complete and branded Avelia Horizon by the manufacturer. That same month, SNCF Mobilités placed a €2.7 billion order for 100 Avelia Horizon trainsets; this order was accompanied by options to potentially change the quantity on order as well as a maintenance package. SNCF observed that the unit costs of the new train were 20 percent less than the older TGV Duplex. Economic consequences of this order include the creation of 4,000 new jobs across the French railway sector, largely within the manufacturing sector via the engagement of ten of Alstom’s facilities in France over a ten-year period; it was also promoted as boosting SNCF's productivity, controlling its costs, and boosting market share.

Between 2018 and 2022, the detailed design of the train was undertaken, along with the preparation of production, and the necessary steps towards its certification to permit its operation. In July 2020, Alstom announced that it had started manufacturing bodyshells for the Avelia Horizon at its plant in La Rochelle; static testing of the first vehicles started in summer 2021 while dynamic testing commenced one year later. The first test phase began in the Czech Republic in December 2022 and is scheduled to continue until summer 2023.

=== Proxima ===
In October 2024, French start-up company Proxima ordered 12 Avelia Horizon high speed trains and 15 years of maintenance for almost 850 million euros. These trains are technically similar to the SNCF Voyageurs version with some minor differences, such as the interior layout. The first deliveries are expected in 2028 and the trains are intended to be deployed on the high speed lines between Paris and the Atlantic coast. It will operate with the brand name of Velvet.

=== ONCF ===
In March 2025, ONCF signed a contract with Alstom to provide 18 Avelia Horizon trains for Morocco's expansion of its high speed Al-Boraq service to Marrakech. The contract was valued at €781 million, and was financed by the French treasury.

=== Eurostar ===
In October 2025, Eurostar signed a contract with Alstom for 30 trains, with options for a further 20, valued at approximately €2 billion. Named the Eurostar Celestia, they will be 200 metres long with 540 seats each and will be delivered in January 2031, with service entry from May 2031. The trains will be maintained at Temple Mills Depot in London.

== Specifications ==
The Avelia Horizon is a high-speed train that is promoted as being a fully French design. Furthermore, it is also one member of a wider family of high-speed trains, referred to as Avelia, that has been developed for the global high-speed rail market. In terms of its basic configuration, it is a push–pull trainset, comprising power cars at both ends along with between seven and nine double-decker coaches in an articulated arrangement.

Compared to the previous generation TGV Euroduplex (at 200 m, with 8 passenger cars), the power cars have each been shortened by 4 m, achieved in part by traction motors now directly mounted to the bogies. Moving the main transformers to the underframe allows enough space for auxiliary equipment. Each passenger car has also been shortened by 1 m, resulting in a 9-passenger car train at a total train length of 202 m, with the option of shorter formations.

The TGV M has been designed to be readily adaptable. It is outfitted with a modular interior that permits the operator to adapt the same basic design to suit various types of passenger experiences and market trends. It is possible to rapidly reconfigure an individual coach or train; reportedly, first-class coaches can be converted into second-class coaches within half a day. Features such as luggage storage, bike racks, and additional seating can be added or removed when appropriate. When outfitted with the highest capacity interior layout, each trainset is capable of carrying up to 740 instead of the current 634 passengers.

The TGV M will be the first high-speed train in SNCF Voyageurs service to have complete digital connectivity, provisioned via an optimised onboard internet network that is reportedly capable of integrating future innovations. Amongst other benefits, this shall facilitate on-board WiFi provision along with real-time passenger information displays throughout the train. An intelligently-managed air conditioning system provides precision climate control for greater comfort; airflow is managed via a series of ceiling vents. It has a dual level bar car (car 4), named Le Bistro, with self-service fridges, coffee machines and microwaves on the lower level and seating for 28 passengers on the upper level, though this area is not accessible.

Doors on non-accessible cars have an entry height of 617 mm. The accessible car (car 3) is level with 550 mm platforms, with a rotating interior lift. On 760 mm platforms, such as those in Belgium, the Netherlands, Germany and the UK (on HS1), ramps are required for passengers with mobility impairments, while the accessible car also has active suspension to raise the floor of the accessible entry to 627 mm to aid this.

The interior design and the nose of the train was developed by Arep, a subsidiary of SNCF, and Nendo, a Japanese firm, designed around the theme of "flow", and incorporating the national colours of red, white and blue. All seats have access to USB ports, power sockets and an individual light. Seats are covered in a "3D-woven" fabric, accompanied by yellow table lamps. 3 bicycle spaces are available in each trainset and 8 non-dismantled bicycles (in adjustable luggage racks) can be carried.

It is fitted with ETCS, KVB and TVM signalling, and has a power rating of 7.8 MW. It has a lithium-ion battery pack for emergency power and traction, in the event of an electrical supply failure.

The TGV M is capable of attaining a maximum speed of 350 km/h (217 mph). A 20 percent reduction in energy consumption is attributable to the effectiveness of its regenerative braking. In addition, each trainset is composed almost entirely of recyclable materials, the use of more eco-friendly materials resulted in a 37 percent reduction in the TGV M's carbon footprint over that of its predecessors. Via the use of remote diagnostic systems, which facilitates the adoption of predictive maintenance practices, a 30 percent reduction in maintenance costs has been claimed by the manufacturer. Furthermore, a large proportion of the components used benefit from an optimised design that should simplify maintenance procedures and facilitate longer intervals between maintenance actions.

== See also ==
- Avelia Liberty, another Alstom Avelia product, in service on Amtrak's Acela service along the Northeast Corridor.
- TGV Duplex
