= Bardellino =

Bardellino is an Italian surname. Notable people with the surname include:

- Antonio Bardellino (1945–1988), powerful Neapolitan Camorrista and boss of the Casalesi clan
- Pietro Bardellino (1728–1806), Italian painter

== See also ==
- Bardella (disambiguation)
