= Avelia Stream =

High-speed train family of Alstom

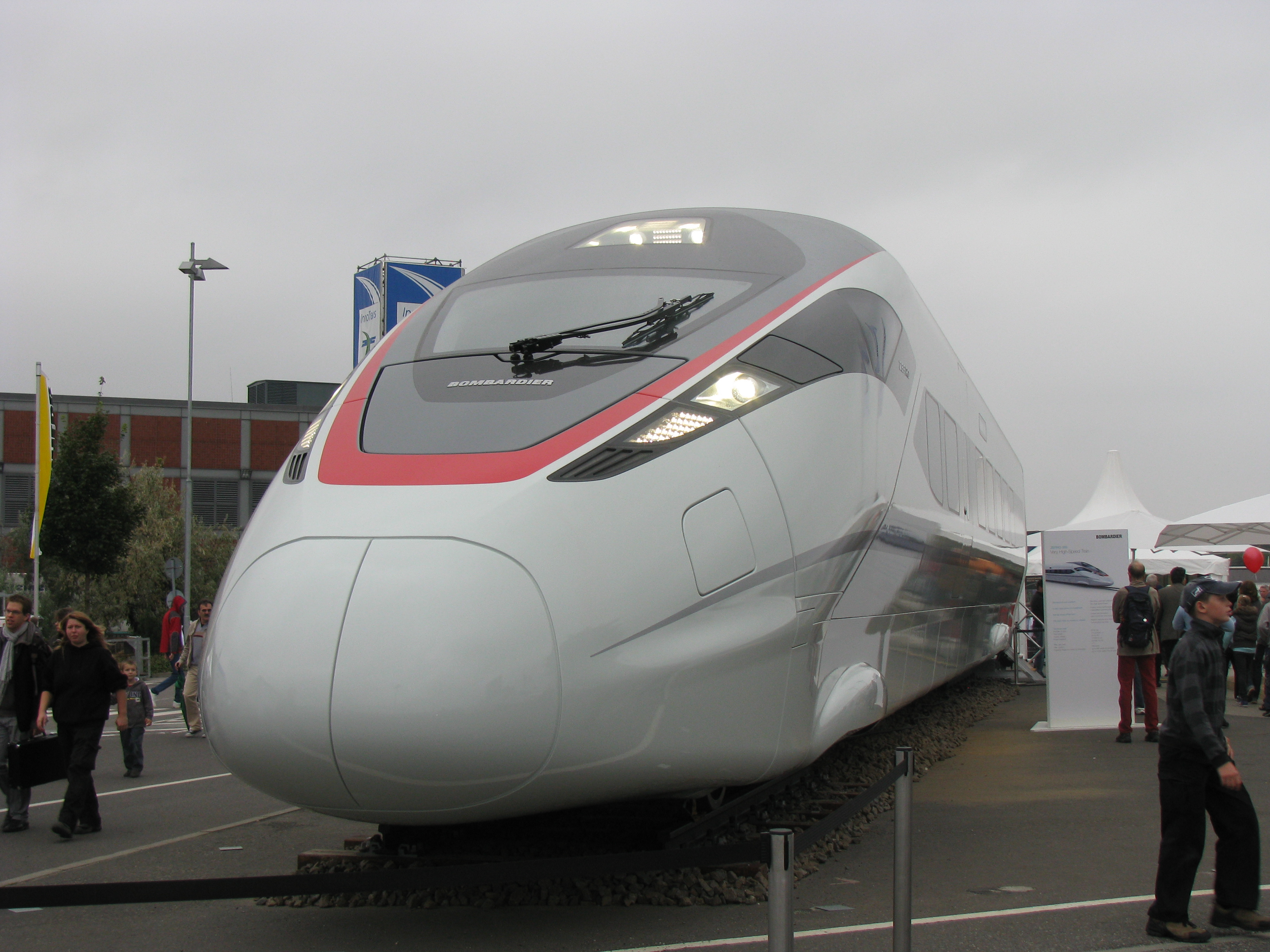
- Alstom Zefiro 380
- Manufacturer: Alstom
- Family name: Avelia
- Constructed: 2009–present

Specifications
- Current collection: Pantograph

Avelia Stream is a product family of rolling stock manufacturer Alstom that bundles its single deck high-speed passenger trains with distributed traction and conventional bogies. It is part of Avelia, the high-speed product line of Alstom. Its variants have top operating speeds of between 200 km/h (125 mph) and 350 km/h (220 mph).

== Models ==
Since 2024, the Avelia Stream family is the union of two different product families:

- New Pendolino, a class of high-speed built by Alstom Ferroviaria (Savigliano, ex Fiat Ferroviaria) for Trenitalia and Cisalpino, and with option of tilting.
- Certain models of the Zefiro family, namely Zefiro 250, Zefiro 380 and Zefiro Express, designed by Bombardier Transportation. The Zefiro 250 has a top operating speed of 250 km/h (155 mph) and is for the moment wholly manufactured in China. The Zefiro 380 has a top operating speed of 350 km/h (220 mph).Zefiro Express is renamed to Avelia Stream Nordic (X80) for its version running in Sweden, which received a 2025 Red Dot Design Award.

== History ==
In August 2025, Virgin Trains Europe signed a letter of intent with Alstom to purchase 12 Avelia Stream sets, contingent on it being awarded rights to operate services from London St Pancras via the High Speed 1 line and Channel Tunnel to Paris, Brussels and Amsterdam. Rail experts expected these train sets to be a non-tilting variant of the New Pendolino product line.

== See also ==
- Siemens Velaro - competitor of similar design.
- Alstom AGV - similar design.
- List of high-speed trains
