= Bardella =

Bardella is a surname. Notable people with this surname are:

- Jordan Bardella (born 1995), French politician and spokesman of the National Rally Party
- Rodolfo José da Silva Bardella (born 1992), Brazilian midfielder footballer

== See also ==
- Abba Kohen Bardela
- Bardello
- Bardellino
