= Alstom =

French rolling stock manufacturer

Alstom SA

- Alstom headquarters
- Formerly: Als-thom (1928–1930); Alsthom (1930–1980); Alsthom Atlantique (1980–1989); GEC Alsthom (1989–1998)
- Type: Public
- Traded as: Euronext Paris: ALO; CAC Next 20 component
- ISIN: FR0010220475
- Industry: Rail transport
- Founded: 1928; 98 years ago
- Headquarters: Saint-Ouen-sur-Seine, France
- Key people: Martin Sion (Chairman and CEO)
- Products: Railway vehicles, service and systems, signalling, electric road systems
- Revenue: ▲€18.48 billion (2024/2025)
- Operating income: 544,000,000 euro (2025)
- Net income: ▲€498 million (2024/2025)
- Total assets: ▲€34.58 billion (2024/2025)
- Total equity: ▲€10.57 billion (2024/2025)
- Owner: CDPQ (17.5%)
- Number of employees: 86,039 (March 2025)
- Website: alstom.com
- Footnotes; Financial figures are for fiscal year ended 31 March 2022. References

Alstom SA (French: [alstɔm]) is a French multinational rail transport systems manufacturer. It is active in the fields of passenger transportation, rail services, signalling, and locomotives, producing high-speed, suburban, regional and urban trains along with trams.

The company and its name (originally spelled Alsthom) were formed by a merger between the electric engineering division of Société Alsacienne de Constructions Mécaniques (Als) and Compagnie Française Thomson-Houston (thom) in 1928. Significant acquisitions later included the Constructions Électriques de France (1932), shipbuilder Chantiers de l'Atlantique (1976) (sold in 2006), and parts of ACEC (late 1980s).

== History ==
=== Alsthom (1928–1989) ===
Alsthom (at the time, with an 'h' in the word) was founded in 1928 from the merger of the French heavy engineering subsidiary of the Thomson-Houston Electric Company, the Compagnie française Thomson Houston, CFTH, and of the Société Alsacienne de Constructions Mécaniques. In 1932, Alsthom expanded into transportation by acquiring the Constructions électriques de France, Tarbes, a manufacturer of electric locomotives as well as electrical and hydraulic equipment.

In 1969, Compagnie Générale d'Électricité (CGE) became the majority shareholder of Alsthom. In 1976, Alsthom merged with Chantiers de l'Atlantique, becoming Alsthom Atlantique. Thus, the business expanded into marine. The next year, it constructed the first 1300 MW generator set for the Paluel Nuclear Power Plant, setting a world record with an output of 1500 MW.

In 1978, Alsthom delivered its first TGV to SNCF. The TGV went on to break world rail speed records in 1981 (at 380 kilometres per hour (240 mph)) and in 1990 (at 515.3 kilometres per hour (320.2 mph)). It also set the world endurance record for high-speed train lines in 2001, travelling the 1,067.2 kilometres (663.1 mi) from Calais to Marseille in 3 hours and 29 minutes. In 1986, Alsthom Belfort received an order from EDF for the largest gas turbine in the world (212 MW).

In 1988–89, the holding company, CGEE Alsthom, acquired ACEC Énergie (hydroturbines and electrical equipment for the nuclear industry) and ACEC Automatisme (automation) from the dissolution of the Belgian electrical engineering company Ateliers de Constructions Electriques de Charleroi. Alsthom acquired 100% of ACEC's transport division and renamed it ACEC Transport.

=== GEC Alsthom (1989–1998) ===
In early 1989, GEC Alsthom was formed from a 50–50 merger of Alsthom and the Power Systems Division of the British General Electric Company; for Alsthom this move was intended to aid Alsthom in selling its products outside the French market. In May of that year GEC Alsthom bought British rail vehicle manufacturer Metro-Cammell.

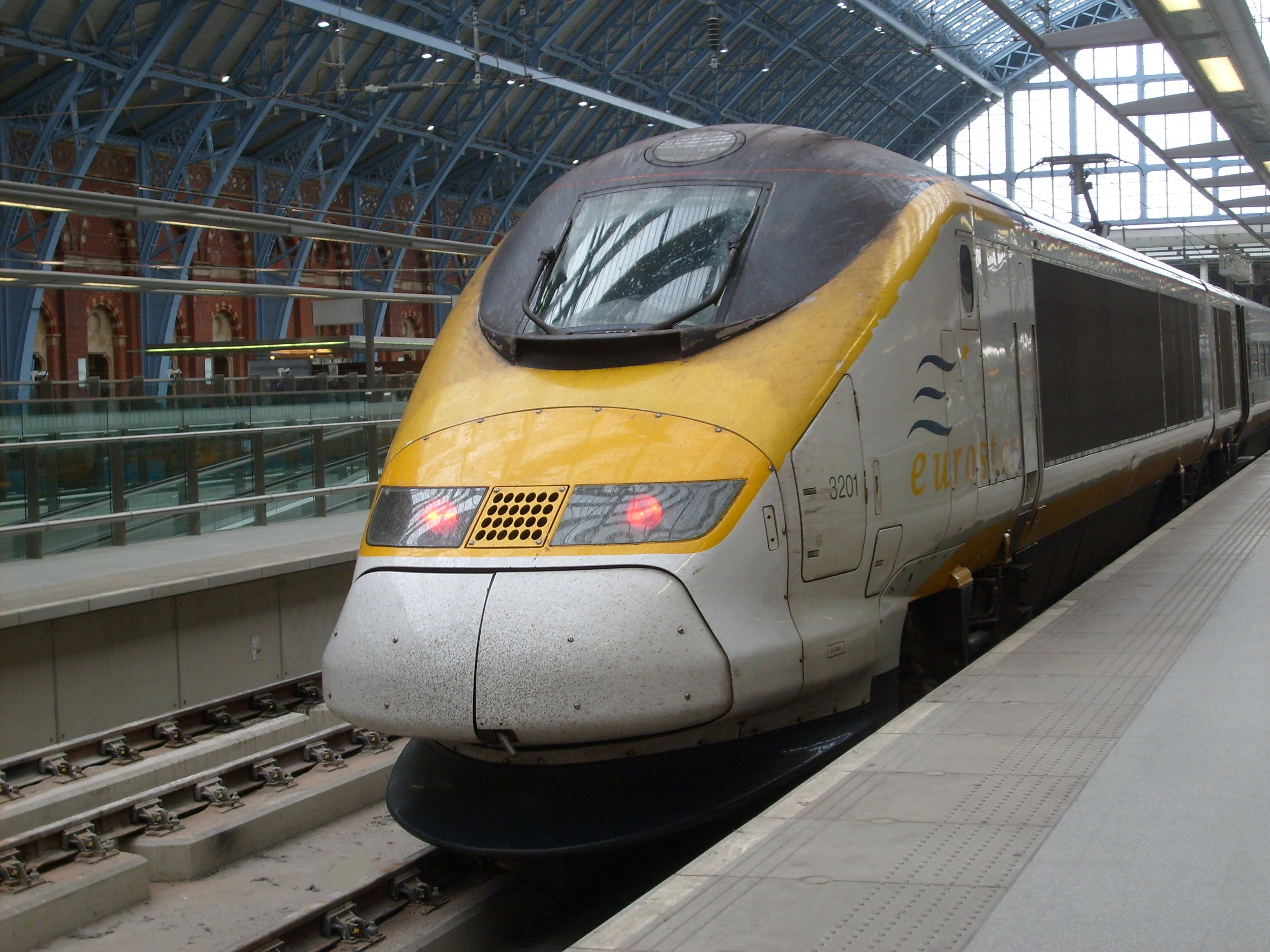
A Class 373 train at London St Pancras. The class 373 was built by Alstom in the early to mid-1990s for the Eurostar high-speed service from England to France and Belgium.

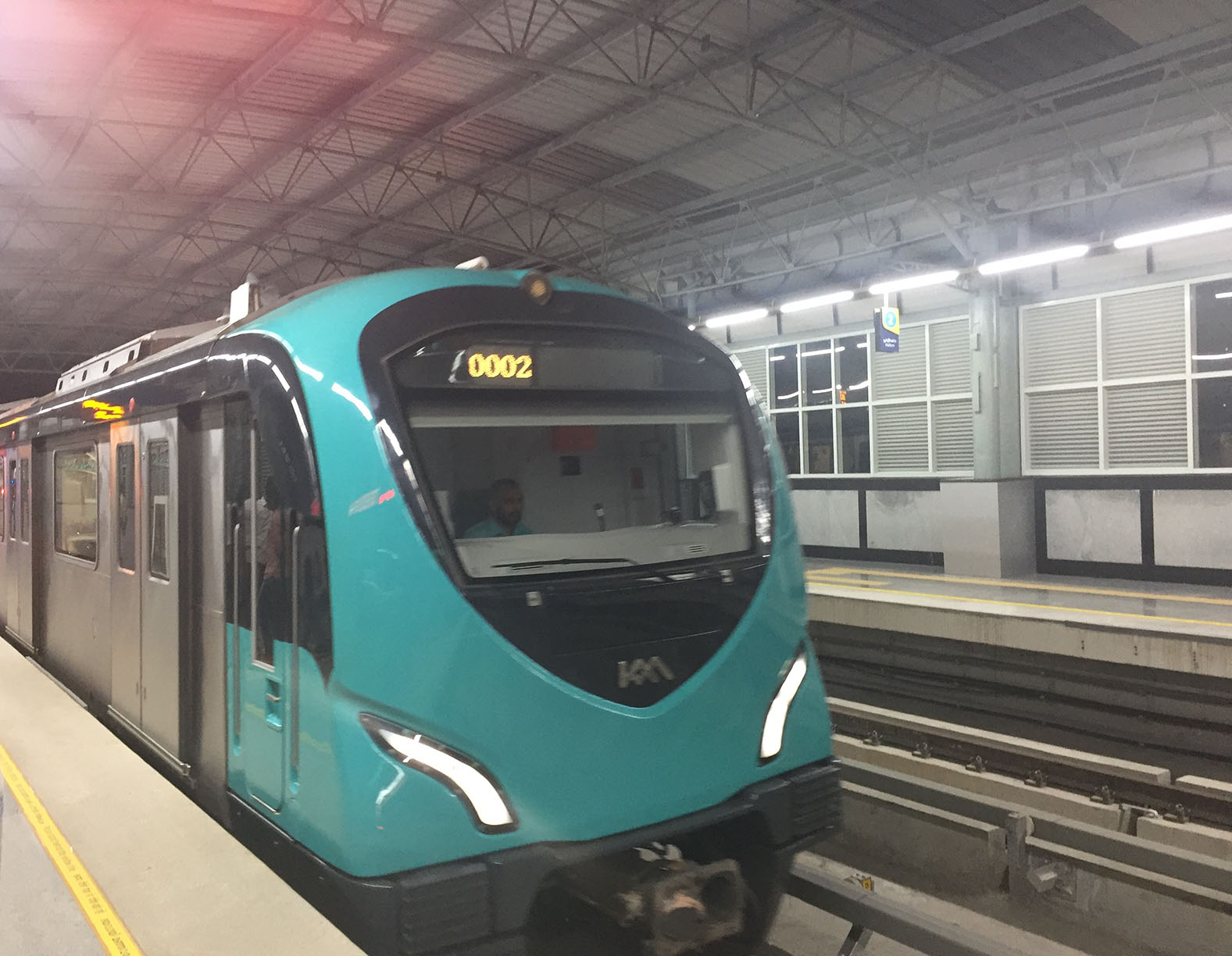
Alstom Metropolis train running on the Kochi Metro built in 2017

During the early-1990s, GEC Alsthom was the principal manufacturer of the British Rail Class 373, a variant of their TGV family specially designed for traversing the Channel Tunnel between the UK and France. Although collectively operated by Eurostar, the type was ordered by three different railway companies: 16 by SNCF, four by NMBS/SNCB, and 18 by British Rail, of which seven were shortened North of London sets. The first Class 373 set was completed at GEC Alstom's Belfort facility during 1992.

In 1994, GEC Alsthom acquired a 51% shareholding in Linke-Hofmann-Busch from Salzgitter AG. In 1995, the company acquired the remaining shares in the steam turbine manufacturer MAN Energie. In early 1998, GEC Alsthom acquired the electrical contractor Cegelec, renaming it Alstom Power Conversion.

In 1998, GEC Alsthom bought Italian firm SASIB's rail signalling subsidiary Sasib Railways, which included the former General Railway Signal (USA).

In June 1998, GEC Alsthom was listed on the Paris Stock Exchange; both GEC and Alcatel elected to sell off part of their stakes (23.6% each). Around this time, the company was officially renamed Alstom.

=== Alstom (1999–2014) ===
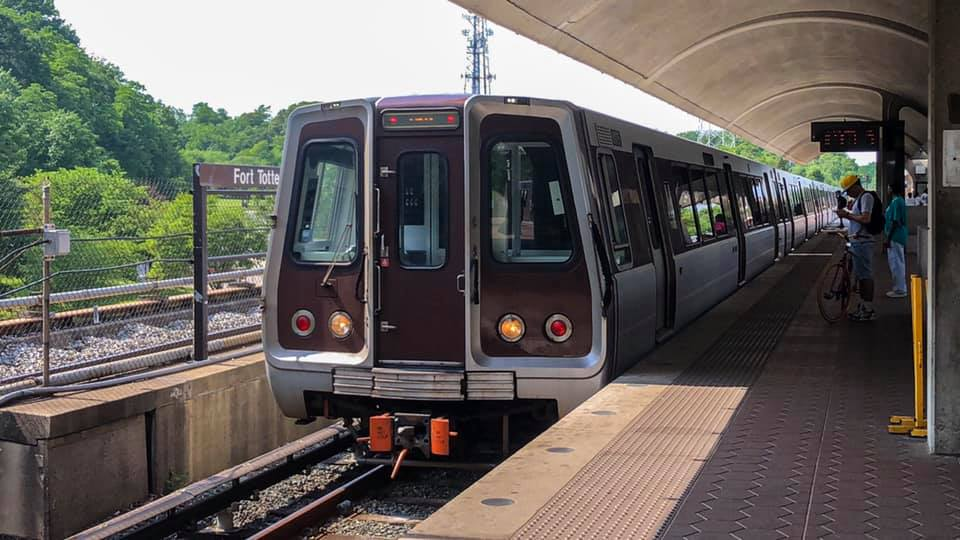
Washington Metro 6000 series railcars built by Alstom in 2006

In 1999, Alstom bought half of ABB's power systems division, forming a 50-50 joint company known as ABB Alstom Power. Alstom also bought Canada's Télécité, a passenger information and security solutions company, and sold to General Electric its heavy-duty gas turbine business (GE license design) The next year, the company bought out ABB's share in the former joint venture ABB Alstom Power.

In 2000, Alstom sold its diesel engine businesses (Ruston, Paxman, and Mirrlees Blackstone) to MAN Group. It also acquired a 51% stake in Italian rail manufacturer Fiat Ferroviaria, a world leader in tilting technology. In April 2003, Alstom sold its industrial turbine business to Siemens for €1.1 billion.

By 2003, Alstom was facing a financial crisis caused by a mix of poor sales and over $5 billion of debt liabilities. It reportedly had the potential to force the company's liquidation. These heavy debts were largely due to a $4 billion charge over a design flaw in a turbine developed by ABB, acquired by Alstom in 2000, as well as the collapse of customer Renaissance Cruises amid a general downturn in the marine market. Alstom's share price had dropped by 90% over two years. The European Commission objected to a €3.2 billion rescue plan involving the French state; European Union competition law bans most state aid without EC permission. This was obtained, but required Alstom to sell several of its subsidiaries, including its shipbuilding and electrical transmission assets.

In 2004, the French state took a 21% stake in Alstom for €772 million and Alstom received an EU-approved bailout worth in total €2.5 billion. The company sold its electrical transmission and distribution ("grid") activities to Areva, the diesel locomotive manufacturer Meinfesa to Vossloh, and Alstom Power Rentals to APR LLC. In 2010, Alstom re-acquired the electric power transmission division of Areva.

In 2005, the former Metro-Cammell rail vehicle works in Washwood Heath closed. In the same year, Alstom sold its Australian subsidiary, Alstom Transport Australia and New Zealand, to United Group, which became part of the latter's UGL Rail division. Alstom would restart its manufacturing operations in Australia by the early 2010s.

In 2006, Alstom sold its Marine Division to the Norwegian group Aker Yards, with a commitment to retain 25% of the shares until 2010; it also sold Alstom Power Conversion, which became Converteam, in a leveraged buy-out deal funded by Barclays Private Equity France SAS.

In June 2006, Bouygues acquired the French government's 21% holding in Alstom for €2 billion. Later that year, Bouygues elected to increase its shareholding in the firm to 24%.

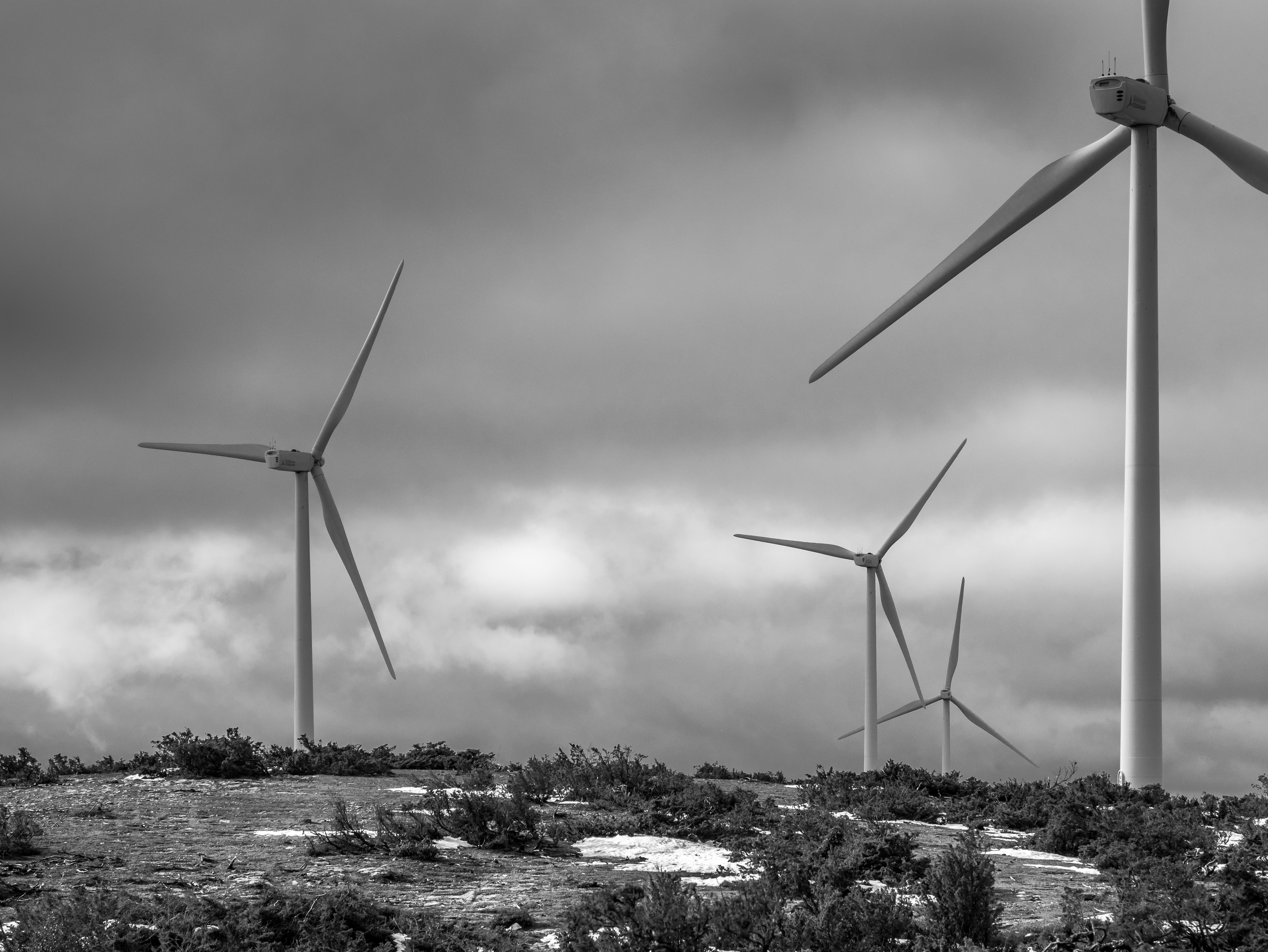
Alstom-Ecotècnia wind turbines in Spain

In 2007, the TGV POS set the world speed record for rail vehicles of 574.8 kilometres per hour (357.2 mph). In March, Alstom acquired Power Systems Manufacturing LLC (Florida, USA) a manufacturer of gas turbine components from Calpine Corporation for $242 million. In June, Alstom acquired the Spanish wind turbine manufacturer Ecotècnia, renamed as Alstom Ecotècnia (since 2010 Alstom Wind). The company also adopted a new graphic chart (logo, corporate identity) using "alstom" as its trading name, reserving "Alstom SA" for legal documents.

In 2009, Alstom acquired a 25% stake in the Russian locomotive manufacturer Transmashholding. Six years later, Alstom decided to increase its shareholding in Transmashholding to 33% at a reported cost of €54 million. As a consequence of an alignment agreement between Transmashholding and another entity, LocoTech-Service, Alstom's stake in the former decreased to 20% in August 2018.

In 2011, Alstom and the Iraqi government signed a memorandum of understanding regarding the construction of a new high-speed rail line between Baghdad and Basra.

In 2012, Alstom opened construction of factories at Sorel-Tracy, Quebec, Canada (passenger rail vehicles). After a consortium of Alstom (Alstom Wind), EDF, and DONG Energy was awarded three major French offshore wind farm contracts, the company initiated construction of factories at Cherbourg-en-Cotentin (turbine blades in association with LM Power, also wind turbine towers) and Saint-Nazaire (Nacelles and generators).

Also in 2012, the company formed a joint venture with RusHydro to manufacture hydropower equipment for small and medium power hydropower plants (up to about 100 MW).

Late in 2012, to further the development of its tidal energy business, Alstom acquired Tidal Generation Ltd from Rolls-Royce, however this was later sold to GE in 2015 as part of the sale of Alstom's energy business.

In November 2013, Alstom announced it planned to raise €1 to €2 billion through sale of some non-core assets, plus the possible sale of a stake in Alstom Transport, and cut 1,300 jobs. In 2014, Alstom sold its steam auxiliary components activities (air preheaters and gas-gas heaters for thermal power, other industrial heat transfer equipment, and grinding mills) to Triton Partners for €730 million.

In November 2014, Alstom was awarded a $429.4 million contract to modernise 85 trains for the Mexico City Metro system.

==== Judicial investigations ====
Starting in 2009, Alstom's practices were questioned by the United States Department of Justice (DOJ) on the basis that they violated the 1977 Foreign Corrupt Practices Act. This American law has extraterritorial scope. At the time, Alstom seemed to cooperate with the proceedings. In 2010, the DOJ opened an investigation into Alstom's commercial practices, focusing on a 2003 deal in Indonesia valued at $118 million in particular.

On 13 April 2013, Alstom senior executive Frédéric Pierucci was arrested at the John F. Kennedy International Airport in New York. He was accused of willful blindness of his company's suspected corruption and was imprisoned in a high security facility for 14 months and denied release on bail until the week of Alstom's acquisition by the US conglomerate General Electric. In late 2014, Alstom was fined $772 million by the DOJ, and admitted guilt under the Foreign Corrupt Practices Act in relation to bribes paid to obtain contracts in various countries.

In mid-2014, Alstom Network UK was charged by the UK Serious Fraud Office (SFO) in relation to corruption offences alleged to have been committed when obtaining transportation contracts in India, Poland and Tunisia, covered under sections 1 of the Prevention of Corruption Act 1906 and Criminal Law Act 1977. Further charges were brought in late 2014 by the SFO in relation to corrupt practices used to obtain energy contracts in Lithuania. Additional charges relating to contracts for the Budapest Metro in Hungary were added in April 2015. In December 2018, three executives of Alstom were found guilty of conspiracy to corrupt following an investigation by the SFO into allegations of several Lithuanian politicians and officials being offered bribes in return for securing contracts.

In February 2020, the United Nations published a database of all business enterprises involved in certain specified activities related to the Israeli settlements. Alstom has been listed on the database in light of its involvement in activities related to "the provision of services and utilities supporting the maintenance and existence of settlements" and "the use of natural resources, in particular water and land, for business purposes". On 5 July 2021, Norway's largest pension fund KLP said it would divest from Alstom together with 15 other business entities implicated in the UN report for their links to Israeli settlements in the occupied West Bank.

=== Sale of energy businesses to General Electric ===
On 24 April 2014, unconfirmed reports claimed that US conglomerate General Electric (GE) was in acquisition talks with Alstom for $13 billion with the support of 29%-shareholder Bouygues, causing Alstom's share price to rise 18% in one day. On 27 April, Le Figaro reported that a rival 'cash plus asset swap' offer was issued by Siemens, trading Alstom's power business for part of its rail arm, plus a cash offer as good as GE's and job guarantees. Siemens' bid was reportedly promoted by French economic minister Arnaud Montebourg. Siemens and Alstom had a greater product overlap and thus a greater risk to jobs, along with potential issues with EU competition regulators. Siemens' offer was characterised as "defensive", being skeptically received by investors and analysts.

On 29 April, Reuters reported that Alstom's board had accepted a €10 billion bid by GE for its energy division; In a letter from GE executive Jeffrey R. Immelt to President François Hollande published in Les Echos, Immelt gave assurances about continued investment in Alstom's French activities, the security of the civil nuclear sector, and on job commitments made by Alstom Wind, whilst making its wind activities available to investors. On 30 April, Alstom confirmed that an offer for its power and grid divisions (representing an equity value of €12.35 billion, €11.4 billion enterprise value) was under review with key interests including the French state. On 30 April, GE confirmed it had made a $16.9 billion offer, comprising a $13.5 billion value plus $3.4 billion cash. On 5 May, GE offered to buy one-fourth of the shares in Alstom's Indian power and distribution companies – Alstom T&D India and Alstom India – at 261.25 and 382.20 rupees a share (value US$278 million and $111 million respectively) subject to its bid for Alstom SA being successful.

On 5 May 2014, the French government stated it did not back GE's bid, citing concerns on the future of Alstom's rail division as a smaller separate entity, suggesting that GE transfer its own rail division to Alstom; other concerns were over the civil nuclear field's national independence, and French jobs. On 14 May, France issued a decree (Décret n° 2014-479 du 14 mai 2014. (Note: The decree was an amendment to the Code monétaire et financier (French), extending powers given by Decree No. 2005-1739 (30 December 2005); the Décret n° 2014-479 du 14 mai 2014 relatif aux investissements étrangers. was nicknamed the "décret Alstom", or the "décret Montebourg". Arnaud Montebourg stated that the decree protected France's strategic interests and was the end of laissez-faire economic policy.)), nicknamed "décret Alstom", extending to power of the state to veto the takeover of "strategic interests" into areas of energy supply, water, transport, telecoms and public health. Both the French employer organisation MEDEF and the European Commissioner for Internal Market and Services (Michel Barnier) responded negatively to the decree.

On 16 June, Siemens and Mitsubishi Heavy Industries (MHI) submitted a competing offer for Siemens to acquire Alstom's gas turbine activities for €3.9 billion while MHI would form joint ventures with Alstom, acquiring 40%, 20% and 20% stakes in Alstom's steam and nuclear, electrical grid, and hydroelectric businesses respectively, for €3.1 billion. The proposal included an offer to buy a further 10% stake from shareholder Bouygues and an option to form a rail transport joint venture. On 19 June, GE revised its bid, matching the same price with a lower cash transaction value; it also proposed forming a joint venture of their renewable, electric grid, steam turbine and nuclear power businesses. GE announced a memorandum of understanding between the two firms in the rail sector and the sale of GE's rail signalling unit to Alstom. On 20 June, Siemens and MHI modified their bid, with MHI increasing its stake in Alstom's steam, hydro, and grid businesses to 40% in all three (total €3.9 billion) while Siemens increased its offer by €400 million to €4.3 billion. Subsequently, Economy minister Arnaud Montebourg stated he would block both bids, but the French government backed GE's offer and had given GE more specifications on commitments and guarantees; it also intended to buy two-thirds of Bouygues' shareholding (20%). The next day, Alstom's board backed GE's revised bid. On 22 June, the French state agreed terms with Bouygues, buying a 20% stake in Alstom from Bouygues at a 2–5% discount on a minimum value of ≈€35 per share. (Note: The 20% shareholding gave the state two seats on the board. The share purchase deal was for 20 months, after which the state was entitled to a 15% share at a similar markdown on the actual market price.)

Initially, the acquisition was expected to be finalised by early 2015. In early 2015, the EU Competition Commission began examining the deal. Both EU and US competition regulators approved the deal by September 2015, subject to the divestiture of Alstom's large and very large gas turbine (GT26 and GT36 models) manufacturing and service business; and its GE7FA gas turbine aftermarket parts subsidiary business, Power Systems Mfg. LLC (PSM), to another company, Ansaldo Energia.

The sale of Alstom's energy division to GE was finalised on 2 November 2015; the final valuation being €12.4 billion, of which €9.7 billion was transferred to Alstom, the remainder being reinvested in GE/Alstom joint ventures plus other corrections. The acquired businesses were reorganised within GE's existing power generation business (GE Power & Water) as GE Power. The remainder of Alstom Group, including GE Signalling (acquired via a €700 million deal), refocused on rail transport. Due to the acquisition, GE accrued $17.3bn of goodwill, consisting of Alstom's negative book value of $7.2bn at the time of acquisition and the $10.1bn purchase price. In October 2018, GE wrote-off $23bn from the value of its power industry division, largely attributed to the Alstom purchase.

=== November 2015 – present ===
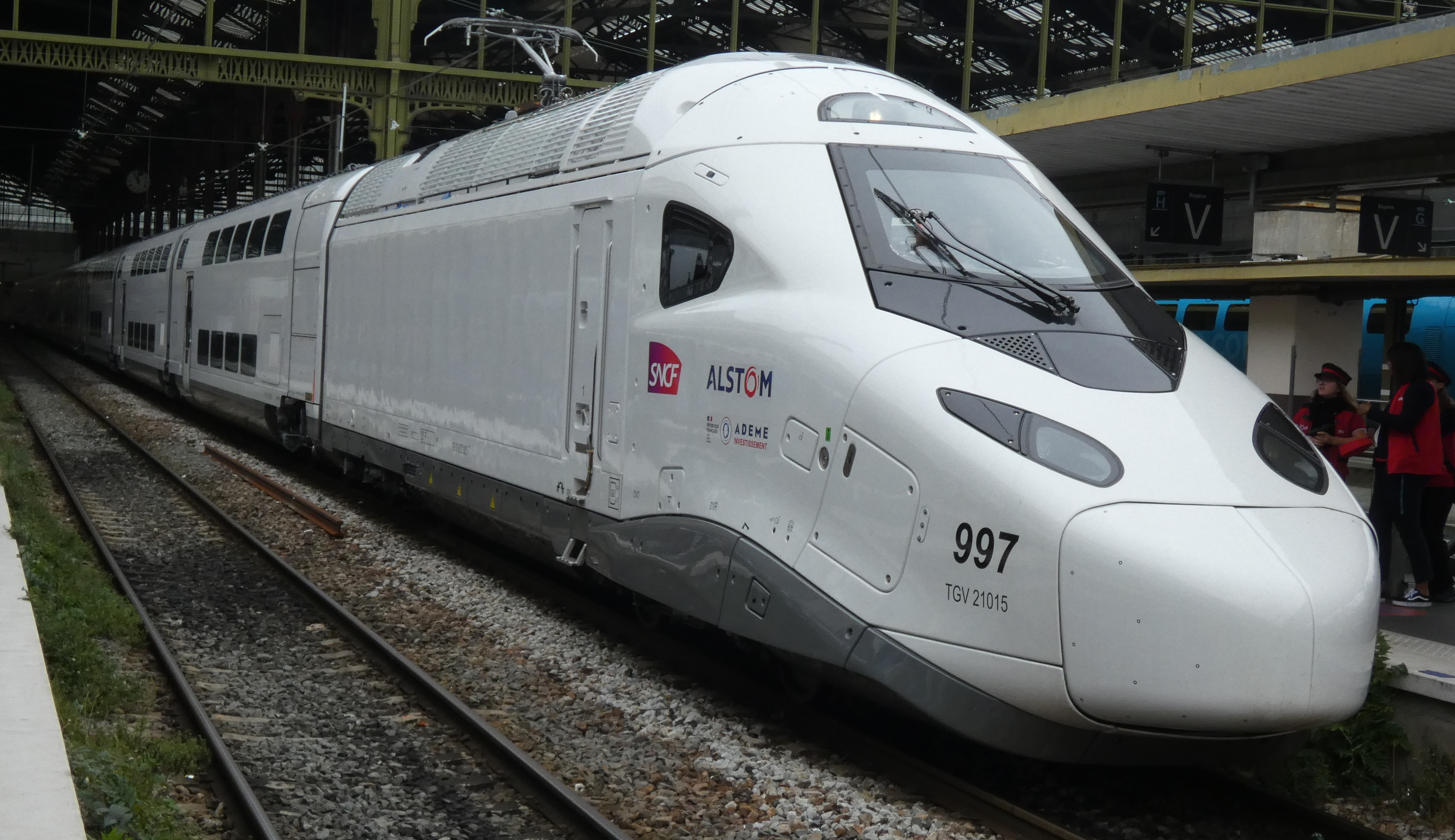
The TGV M is expected to enter service with the French train operator SNCF in TGV service in 2026.

In November 2015, Alstom was awarded a contract by the Indian Railways to construct an electric locomotive factory in Madhepura (Bihar), receiving an initial order of 800 twin-section 9MW locomotives for use on the Eastern Dedicated Freight Corridor, valued at ₹190 billion (about US$2.9 billion). This factory was to be operated under a joint venture with the Ministry of Railways (26%) at a cost of ₹13 billion (roughly US$200 million).

In September 2015, it was announced that Amtrak would award Alstom a contract for $2.5 billion for the next generation high-speed train sets for the Northeast Corridor. This would result in the creation of 750 jobs across upstate New York with 400 direct manufacturing jobs at Alstom. The order for 28 Avelia Liberty trainsets was officially confirmed in August 2016 by Amtrak. These trainsets are manufactured at Alstom's plant in Hornell, New York.

In March 2016, a joint venture of Alstom and Gibela began construction of a new 60,000 square metres (650,000 sq ft) train building factory in Dunnotar, outside of Johannesburg, South Africa. Initial orders for the factory included 580 X'Trapolis Mega passenger trains for Passenger Rail Agency of South Africa under a €4 billion contract that was awarded in 2013.

In September 2016, Alstom announced it was to cease locomotive manufacturing at its Belfort (France) site by 2018 due to low orders; remaining production activity was to be transferred to its facility of Alstom DDF in Reichshoffen, Alsace. However, during October 2016, the French state placed an order of about €650 million for 15 TGV Euroduplex trains; an order for 20 locomotives; plus an order for 30 intercity trains to be built at Reichshoffen. Together, these orders were sufficient to prevent the Belfort plant's closure in the short to medium term.

In June 2017, Alstom opened the largest train modernisation facility in the UK at Halebank on the outskirts of Liverpool. Initial work involved the repainting of the Class 390 Pendolinos.

On 12 November 2024, Alstom announced on their official website that the first of 35 fully automated Metropolis trains has been delivered to Taiwan. The four-car stainless-steel train can carry up to 700 passengers, including 108 seated, with speeds up to 100 km/h.

In September 2025, Alstom was awarded a NZ$1.066 billion contract to build and maintain 18 new battery trains New Zealand BEMU class electric multiple unit in Wellington. The trains will be built in India. The trains will arrive in New Zealand in around 2029 and enter service in 2030.

In September 2026, Alstom was awarded a £1 billion contract to construct a fleet of battery-powered trains for the UK. Twenty-nine trains are to be built starting in 2028 and would be delivered from 2034 onward.

==== Attempted merger with Siemens Mobility ====
On 26 September 2017, Alstom announced a proposal to merge with Siemens Mobility, the rolling stock division of German conglomerate Siemens; this merger was promoted as the creation of "a new European champion in the rail industry". The combined rail business, which was to have been reportedly named Siemens Alstom and headquartered in Paris, would have $18 billion U.S. in revenue and employ 62,300 people in more than 60 countries. During November 2018, the European Commission voiced its concerns surrounding the proposed merger of the two companies, particularly that the combined entity would be too dominant in the European market; alleged impacts from such dominance included potential increases in passenger fares and cargo fees. Furthermore, a series of popular protests concerning the financial reforms of both the French territorial railway infrastructure and SNCF occurred.

The proposed merger was viewed by some as a measure to counter the rise of rival Chinese rail business CRRC; it reportedly received support from many figures within both the French and German governments. The transaction, which was originally due to close by the end of 2018, was met with opposition by French trade union officials who voiced their concerns that such a merger would have the potential for job losses. On 17 July 2018, Alstom shareholders overwhelmingly approved the proposed merger with Siemens. On 6 February 2019, the planned merger between the two companies was vetoed by the European Commission. In response to this ruling, Alstom's Chief Executive Officer Henri Poupart-Lafarge stated that he viewed the decision to block the merger was a result of "ideological prejudices".

==== Acquisition of Bombardier Transportation ====
In mid-February 2020, Alstom announced that it had signed a Memorandum of Agreement to buy Bombardier Transportation, the multinational train maker headquartered in Berlin, Germany for between €5.8 billion and €6.2 billion. The deal required the approval by Alstom shareholders at a meeting to be held in October 2020 and approval by European regulators. Bombardier's major shareholder, Caisse de dépôt et placement du Québec, had already agreed to the sale.

In July 2020, it was announced that the EU competition authorities had approved the purchase. To finish the deal, Alstom had to sell the Alstom DDF factory based in France, a regional train division, a Bombardier facility in Germany, and a Bombardier trains division. The company also had to provide guarantees and pass on some of Bombardier's assets.

The merger between Alstom and Bombardier was completed on 29 January 2021.

==== 2024 debt restructuring ====
Alstom plans in 2024 to issue €1.75 billion of shares and bonds to reduce its debt, which was at risk of a credit downgrade into junk bond status.

==== 2024 sale of American rail signaling business ====
In September 2024, Alstom completed the sale of its American rail signalling business to Knorr-Bremse for $690 million.

==== 2025 agreement with Virgin Trains ====
In August 2025, Alstom closed an agreement with Virgin Trains for 12 new high-speed Avelia Stream trains. The trains will be part of Virgin's new £700 million service across western Europe, including through the Channel Tunnel.

== Products ==
Alstom Transport develops and markets a complete range of systems, equipment, and service in the railway industry. The division had annual sales of €5.5 billion in 2013. It is one of the world's largest manufacturers of high-speed trains, tramways and metros, electrical and diesel trains, information systems, traction systems, power supply systems, and track work. The company also operates in the rail infrastructure market, designing, producing, and installing infrastructure for the rail network. These include information solutions, electrification, communication systems, track laying, station utilities, as well as workshops and depots. Maintenance, rebuilding, and renovation services are also provided by the company. Alstom Transport operates in 70 countries and employs 26,000 people.

Notable products includes series production of the TGV high-speed trains with over 650 trainsets sold over 25 years, as well as the London Underground 1995 Stock, London Underground 1996 Stock, British Rail Class 390 and AGV.

Since a merger with General Railway Signal in 1998, Alstom has been manufacturing railway signaling equipment at a former GRS factory located in a suburb near Rochester, New York. After the merger with GE signaling the manufacturing was transferred to Missouri, and GRS factory kept engineering the GRS legacy products.

Since 2002, Alstom has manufactured the Pendolino tilting train, following the acquisition of Fiat Ferroviaria.

The company also produces Citadis trams; in 2007, over 1,100 Citadis trams were in use by 28 cities including Dublin, Algiers, Barcelona, Melbourne, Rotterdam and Paris.

Between 2007 and 2010, the company produced 1,002 R160A New York City subway cars at its manufacturing plant in Hornell, New York, while the body shells were built at their Lapa plant, in São Paulo, Brazil. In 2013, Alstom was awarded the contract to supply 168 coaches to Chennai Metro at a cost of ₹1,470 crore (US$160 million). The company also owns the tender for supplying coaches to Kochi Metro. In September 2015, it was announced in Hornell, New York, by Senator Charles Schumer (D-NY) that Amtrak will be awarding Alstom a contract for $2.45 billion for the next-generation high-speed train sets for the Northeast Corridor. This would result in the creation of 750 jobs across upstate New York with 400 direct manufacturing jobs at Alstom. The new trainsets will be able to reach speeds up to 186 mph (300 km/h) and feature active tilting technology. The 28 new train sets were scheduled to enter service by 2023, but only 14 of the 28 have been built as of Spring 2025. The first five trainsets entered service on August 28, 2025.

Next-generation high-speed trains under development by Alstom are the Avelia family: ETR 675, Avelia Horizon and Avelia Liberty.

=== List of rolling stock manufactured by Alstom ===
EMU and DMU

- Current product families:
  - Avelia (high-speed trainsets)
    - Avelia Horizon (TGV M)
    - Avelia Liberty
    - Avelia Stream
      - New Pendolino
      - Zefiro 250, Zerifo 380, Zefiro Express
  - ADR/ADS DMU
  - Adessia (commuter trains)
    - Adessia Stream
    - Adessia Max
    - Adessia Coach
  - Aventra
    - British Rail Class 345
    - British Rail Class 701
    - British Rail Class 710
    - British Rail Class 720
    - British Rail Class 730
  - Coradia
    - Arlanda Express X3
    - SJ X40
    - Skånetrafiken X61
    - Storstockholms Lokaltrafik X60
    - Coradia Stream
      - NS Intercity Nieuwe Generatie
      - IC5
  - X'Trapolis 2.0
  - Transperth C Series
  - V/Line VLocity
  - Namo Bharat
  - M9A
- Former products:
  - AGV
  - Alstom Prima
  - Acela Express (joint venture with Bombardier)
  - British Rail Class 175
  - British Rail Class 180
  - British Rail Class 334
  - British Rail Class 390
  - British Rail Class 458
  - British Rail Class 460
  - IÉ 2700 and 2750 Classes
  - IÉ 8200 Class
  - TGV trains:
    - Euroduplex (TGV 2N2)
    - Eurostar PBKA
    - KTX-I (12 of 46 trainsets, the remaining were licensed to Rotem to build)
    - Renfe S100/101
    - TGV Duplex
    - TGV Sud-Est
    - TGV Atlantique
    - TGV Réseau/Eurostar PBA
    - TGV POS
    - TGV TMST
  - CP Class 9600
  - Z-TER
  - X'Trapolis 100

Locomotives

- Alstom Traxx
- GA DE900 locomotives
- PL42AC
- ALP-45DP
- HHP-8 (joint venture with Bombardier)
- SBB-CFF-FFS Am 841
- Indian locomotive class WAG-12
- NS Class 1100
- NS Class 1300
- NS Class 1600
- NS Class 1700
- NS Class 2400
- SRT Classes ALS, AHK, ALD and ADD
- VR Class Dr13

Metro/subway

- Paris Metro rolling stock
  - MP 59
  - MF 77
  - MF 88
  - MF 2000
- Caracas Metro rolling stock
  - Alsthom Atlantique S10000
  - Alsthom Atlantique S20000
  - GEC Alstom-Siemens AG S30000
  - Alstom-Bombardier S40000
  - Alstom-Bombardier S80000
  - Alstom-Bombardier S50000
- Metropolis
  - C751A
  - C751C
  - C830
  - C830C
  - C851E (on both the North East and Circle Lines of Singapore)
  - Shanghai Metro AC03
  - Shanghai Metro AC06
  - Shanghai Metro AC08
  - Shanghai Metro AC11
  - Shanghai Metro AC13
  - Shanghai Metro AC17
  - Sydney Metro Metropolis Stock
  - Metropolis Saint-Laurent
  - Barcelona Metro 7000 Series
  - Barcelona Metro 8000 Series
  - Barcelona Metro 9000 Series
  - Buenos Aires Underground 100 Series
  - Buenos Aires Underground 300 Series
  - Caracas Metro Alstom Metropolis S90000
  - BM4
  - MP 89
  - MF 01 (MF 2000)
  - MP 05
  - MP 14
  - MR3V/MR6V
  - MRV
  - MF 19
  - NS 93
  - AS 2002
  - NS 2004
  - AM5-M2
  - AM4-M4
  - M5 Series
- Bay Area Rapid Transit C1 Series
- London Underground 1995 Stock
- London Underground 1996 Stock
- NYC Subway:
  - R68 (joint venture with Westinghouse, ANF, and Jeumont Schneider)
  - R160A
- Washington Metro 6000-series
- Montreal Metro MPM-10 (joint venture with Bombardier)
- Alstom Movia

Light rail / trams

- Citadis
- Flexity
- Alstom Innovia – fully automated transportation systems
  - Innovia APM
  - Innovia Metro
  - Innovia Monorail

Passenger coaches

- Bombardier BiLevel Coach
- Surfliner (railcar)
- Comet V
- GEC Alstom Push-Pull Coach (on Israel Railways from 1996 to 2022)
- Bombardier MultiLevel Coach

=== Other products ===
==== Electric road ====
Alstom has developed a ground-level power supply (alimentation par le sol - APS) system for use with buses and other vehicles. The system has been tested for compatibility with snow plows and for safety under exposure to snow, ice, salting, and saturated brine. The eRoadMontBlanc project is set to trial Alstom's electric road system on the public road RN205 on trucks and other vehicles in the Rhône-Alpes region between 2024 and 2027. This is anticipated to be the first public electric road in France.

== Former businesses ==
=== Power generation ===
Alstom power activities were collectively called Alstom Power Systems and included the design, manufacturing, services, and supply of products and systems for the power generation sector and industrial markets. The group covered most energy sources, including gas, coal, nuclear, hydro, wind. Power Systems provided components for power generation including boilers, steam turbines, and gas turbines, wind turbines, generators, air quality control systems, and monitoring and control systems for power plants, as well as related products. It had a special focus on boilers and emissions control equipment.

Power Systems also provided services such as product retrofitting for nuclear and fossil steam turbines and refurbishment of existing power plants. It performed maintenance and servicing under long-term agreements for its own turbines, as well as those manufactured by GE and Siemens.

In Russia, the company serviced nuclear equipment under a joint agreement with Atomenergomash and provided technology transfer for a project of floating nuclear power plants. In Brazil, Alstom, together with Bardella, ran a joint venture called Indústria Metalúrgica e Mecânica da Amazônia to build hydroelectric power plants throughout the Amazon and Latin American regions. In India, Alstom had a joint venture with Bharat Forge to manage power production from start to finish.

In 2015, the entire power sector was taken over by General Electric.

=== Alstom Grid ===
A third business section based on power transmission was formed on 7 June 2010 with the acquisition of the transmission business of Areva SA. The division manufactures equipment for the entire chain of electrical power transmission, including ultra-high voltage transmission lines (both AC and DC). Alstom Grid is headquartered at La Défense, the business district west of Paris, and has four main businesses: electrical transmission system products, power electric system, automation, and service. Alstom Grid has roughly 10% of the global market share.

In 2015, the grid division was taken over by General Electric and renamed as GE Grid Solutions.

== Financial information ==
Alstom was listed on the London, New York and Paris Stock Exchanges when it was floated on 22 June 1998. Following the financial reconstruction in 2003, the company remained listed on the Paris Stock Exchange, but was delisted from the London Stock Exchange on 17 November 2003 and the New York Stock Exchange in August 2004.

=== Indicators ===
	2017	2018	2019	2020	2021	2022	2023	2024	2025	2026
Total revenue (€ bn)	7.3	8.0	8.1	8.2	8.8	15.5	16.5	17.6	18.5	19.2
Operating income (€ bn)	0.4	0.5	0.6	0.6	0.4	0.1	0.3	0.5	0.6	0.7
Net income (€ bn)	0.3	0.5	0.6	0.5	0.3	−0.6	−0.1	−0.3	0.1	0.3
Total assets (€ bn)	14.4	14.1	13.4	13.0	28.6	30.5	31.4	33.3	34.6	35.0
Total equity (€ bn)	3.7	4.0	4.2	3.3	9.1	9.0	9.1	8.8	10.6	10.8
Employees	29,810	30,970	33,500	35,320	67,190	69,320	74,510	78,680	86,040	87,830
