= Intercity Express =

German state-owned high-speed rail system

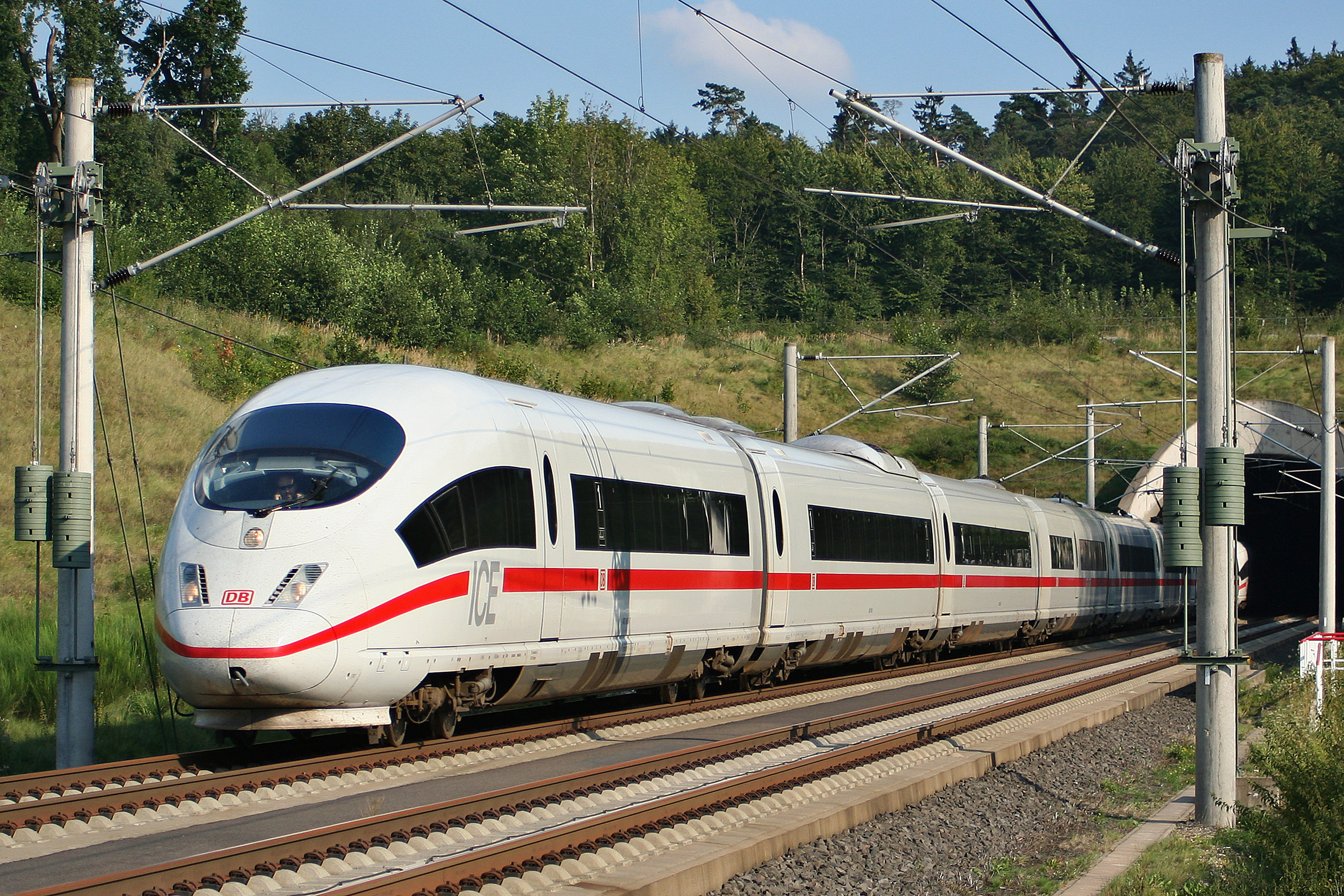
- A German ICE 3 trainset exiting a tunnel

Overview
- Locale: Germany, Netherlands, Belgium, Austria, Switzerland and France. Formerly Denmark.
- Dates of operation: 1985–present
- Predecessor: See History

Technical
- Track gauge: 1,435 mm (4 ft 8 1/2 in) standard gauge

Other
- Website: www.bahn.com/en/trains/ice-ice-sprinter

Intercity Express (commonly known as ICE (German pronunciation: [iːtseːˈʔeː]) and running under this category) is a high-speed rail system and service in Germany. It also serves destinations in Austria, France, Belgium, Switzerland and the Netherlands as part of cross-border services. It is the flagship of the German state railway, Deutsche Bahn. Travelling at speeds up to 300 km/h (190 mph) within Germany and 320 km/h (200 mph) when in France, they are aimed at business travellers and long-distance commuters and marketed by Deutsche Bahn as an alternative to flights.

The ICE 3 also has been the development base for the Siemens Velaro family of trainsets which has subsequently been exported to Renfe in Spain (Renfe Class 103), which are certified to run at speeds up to 350 km/h (220 mph), as well as versions ordered by China for the Beijing–Tianjin intercity railway link (CRH 3) and by Russia for the Moscow–Saint Petersburg and Moscow–Nizhny Novgorod routes (Velaro RUS) with further customers being Eurostar as well as Turkey and Egypt.

== History ==
The Deutsche Bundesbahn started a series of trials in 1985 using the InterCityExperimental (also called ICE-V) test train. The IC Experimental was used as a showcase train and for high-speed trials, setting a new world speed record at 406.9 km/h (253 mph) on 1 May 1988. The train was retired in 1996 and replaced with a new trial unit, called the ICE S.

After extensive discussion between the Bundesbahn and the Ministry of Transport regarding onboard equipment, length and width of the train and the number of trainsets required, a first batch of 41 units was ordered in 1988. The order was extended to 60 units in 1990, with German reunification in mind. However, not all trains could be delivered in time.

The ICE network was officially inaugurated on 29 May 1991 with several vehicles converging on the newly built station Kassel-Wilhelmshöhe from different directions.

In 2007, a line between Paris and Frankfurt/Stuttgart opened, jointly operated by ICE and SNCF's TGV.

== Equipment ==
=== Overview ===
Branding type	Class	Production	Number built	v_{max} [km/h]	In service	Status	Image
InterCityExperimental (also ICE/V)	410.0	1983–1985	1	350	1985–2000 (measurement and test drives)	retired	
ICE 1	401	1989–1993	60	280	since 1990	58 in service	
ICE 2	402/801	1995–1997	46	280	since 1996	ca. 40 in service	
ICE S (also ICE R)	410.1	1996	1	280 / 330	since 1997	in service for measurement and test drives	
ICE T	411	1996–2005	71	230	DB: since 1999; ÖBB: 2006–2020	70 in service	
ICE 3	403	1997–2006	50	330	since 2000	49 in service	
ICE 3M / ICE 3MF	406	1998–2001	17	330	2000-2025	retired	
Metropolitan		1998–1999	2	220	"ICE" branded: 2004–06/2005, 12/2005–2006, 2009–2021	retired	
ICE TD	605	1998–2000	20	200	2001–2003, 2006–2017	retired, 1 remaining for tests as Advanced Train Lab	
ICE 3MS (Siemens Velaro D)	407	2009–2012	17	320	since 2013	all in service	
ICE 4	412/812	2014–2023/24	137	250 / 265	since 2017	all in service	
ICE 3neo (Siemens Velaro MS)	408	2020–2026 (planned)	≥43 (of 90 ordered)	320	since 2022	43 in service	
ICE L	105	since 2019	1+ (of 60 on reduced order - originally 79 ordered)	230	since Dec. 2025	being delivered (4 in service 2025)	

=== First generation ===
The first ICE trains were the trainsets of ICE 1 (power cars: Class 401), which came into service in 1989. The first regularly scheduled ICE trains ran from 2 June 1991 from Hamburg-Altona via Hamburg Hbf–Hannover Hbf–Kassel-Wilhelmshöhe–Fulda–Frankfurt Hbf–Mannheim Hbf and Stuttgart Hbf toward München Hbf at hourly intervals on the new ICE line 6. The Hanover-Würzburg line and the Mannheim-Stuttgart line, which had both opened the same year, were hence integrated into the ICE network from the very beginning.

Due to the lack of trainsets in 1991 and early 1992, the ICE line 4 (Bremen Hbf–Hannover Hbf–Kassel-Wilhelmshöhe–Fulda–Würzburg Hbf–Nürnberg Hbf–München Hbf) could not start operation until 1 June 1992. Prior to that date, ICE trainsets were used when available and were integrated in the Intercity network and with IC tariffs.

In 1993, the ICE line 6's terminus was moved from Hamburg to Berlin (later, in 1998, via the Hanover-Berlin line and the former IC line 3 from Hamburg-Altona via Hannover Hbf–Kassel-Wilhelmshöhe–Fulda–Frankfurt Hbf–Mannheim Hbf–Karlsruhe Hbf–Freiburg Hbf to Basel SBB was upgraded to ICE standards as a replacement).

=== Second generation ===
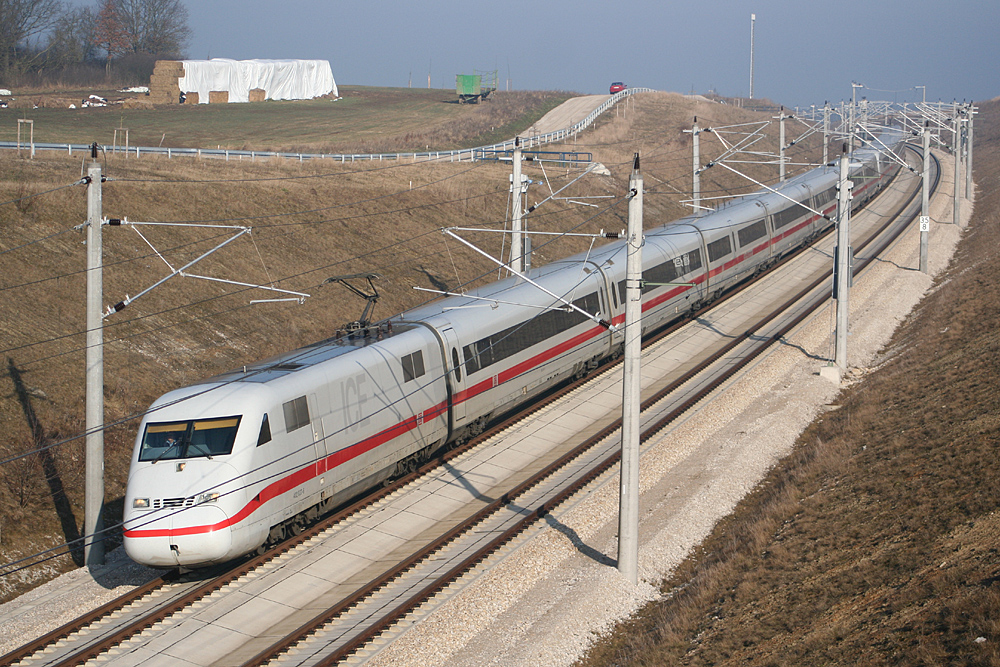
Two coupled ICE 2 trainsets near Ingolstadt

From 1997, the successor, the ICE 2 trains pulled by Class 402 powerheads, was put into service. One of the goals of the ICE 2 was to improve load balancing by building smaller train units which could be coupled or detached as needed.

These trainsets were used on the ICE line 10 Berlin-Cologne/Bonn. However, since the driving van trailers of the trains were still awaiting approval, the DB joined two portions (with one powerhead each) to form a long train, similar to the ICE 1. Only from 24 May 1998 were the ICE 2 units fully equipped with driving van trailers and could be portioned on their run from Hamm via either Dortmund Hbf–Essen Hbf–Duisburg Hbf–Düsseldorf Hbf or Hagen Hbf–Wuppertal Hbf–Solingen-Ohligs.

In late 1998, the Hanover–Berlin high-speed railway was opened as the third high-speed line in Germany, cutting travel time on line 10 (between Berlin and the Ruhr valley) by 2½ hours.

The ICE 1 and ICE 2 trains' loading gauge exceeds that recommended by the international railway organisation UIC. Even though the trains were originally to be used only domestically, some units are licensed to run in Switzerland and Austria. Some ICE 1 units have been equipped with an additional smaller pantograph to be able to run on the different Swiss overhead wire geometry. All ICE 1 and ICE 2 trains are single-voltage 15 kV AC, which restricts their radius of operation largely to the German-speaking countries of Europe. ICE 2 trains can run at a top speed of 280 km/h (174 mph).

=== Third generation ===
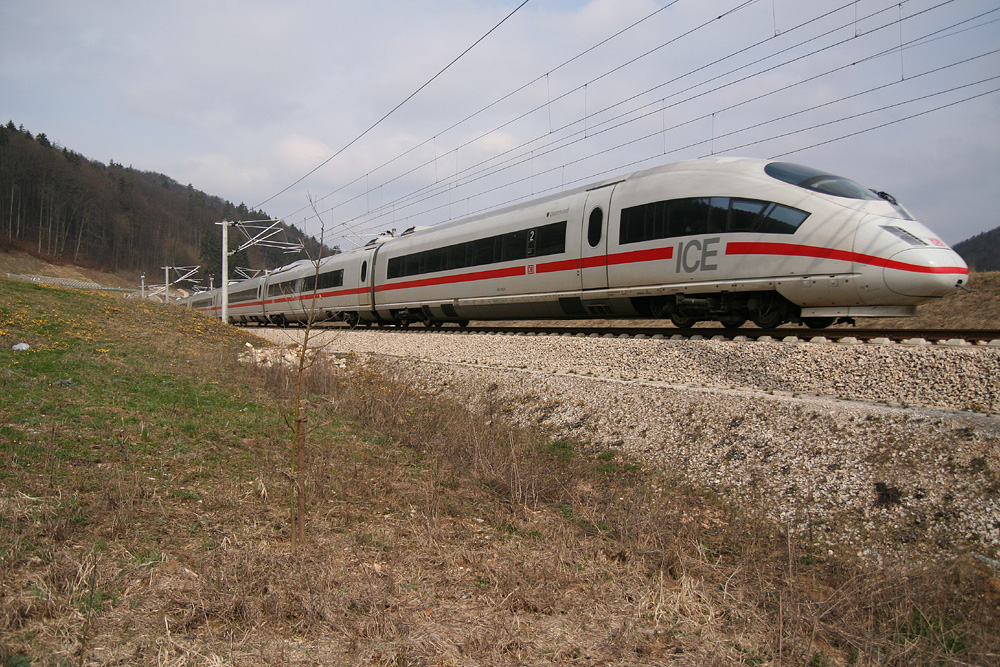
ICE 3 (Class 403)

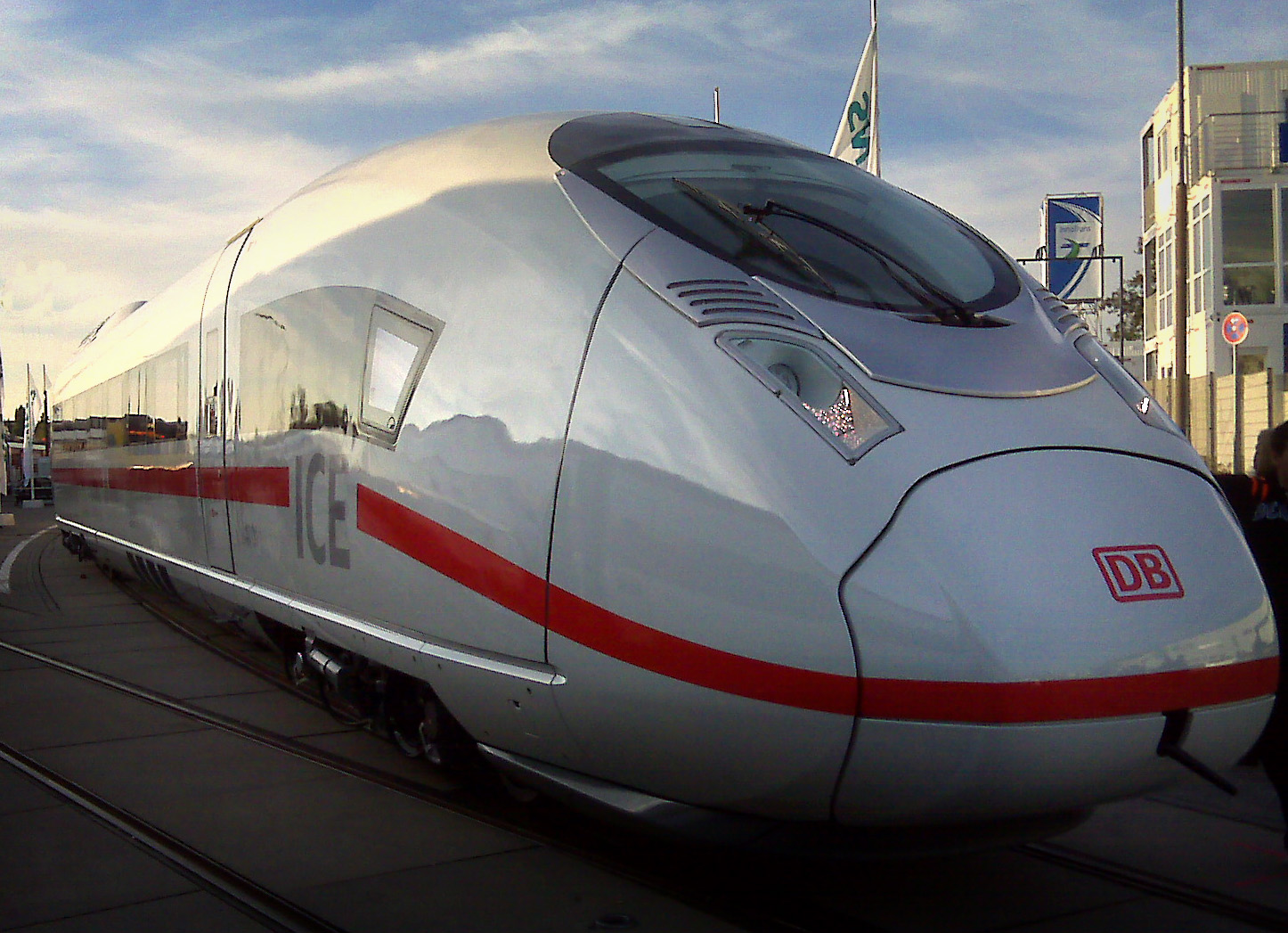
Latest ICE 3 version, a Siemens Velaro D at InnoTrans 2010, after handover of first train to DB. These trains have been designated The New ICE 3.

To overcome the restrictions imposed on the ICE 1 and ICE 2, their successor, the ICE 3, was built to a smaller loading gauge to permit usability throughout the entire European standard gauge network, with the sole exception being the UK's domestic railway network. Unlike their predecessors, the ICE 3 units are built not as trains with separate passenger and power cars, but as electric multiple units with underfloor motors throughout. This also reduced the load per axle and enabled the ICE 3 to comply with the pertinent UIC standard.

Initially two different classes were developed: the Class 403 (domestic ICE 3) and the Class 406 (ICE 3M), the M standing for Mehrsystem (multi-system). Later came Class 407 and Class 408. The trains were labelled and marketed as the Velaro by their manufacturer, Siemens.

Just like the ICE 2, the ICE 3 and the ICE 3M were developed as short trains (when compared to an ICE 1), and are able to travel in a system where individual units run on different lines, then being coupled to travel together. Since the ICE 3 trains are the only ones able to run on the Köln-Frankfurt high-speed line with its 4.0% incline at the allowed maximum speed of 300 km/h, they are used predominantly on services that utilise this line.

In 2009 Deutsche Bahn ordered another 16 units – worth € 495 million – for international traffic, especially to France.

The Erfurt–Leipzig/Halle high-speed railway, which opened in December 2015, is one of three lines in Germany (the others being the Nuremberg-Ingolstadt high-speed rail line and Cologne–Frankfurt high-speed rail line) that are equipped for a line speed of 300 km/h (190 mph). Since only 3rd generation ICE trains can travel at this speed, the ICE line 41, formerly running from Essen Hbf via Duisburg Hbf–Frankfurt Südbf to Nürnberg Hbf, was extended over the Nuremberg-Ingolstadt high-speed rail line and today the service run is Oberhausen Hbf–Duisburg Hbf–Frankfurt Hbf–Nürnberg Hbf–Ingolstadt Hbf–München Hbf.

The ICE 3 runs at speeds up to 320 km/h (200 mph) on the LGV Est railway Strasbourg–Paris in France.

A new generation ICE 3, Class 407, is part of the Siemens Velaro family with the model designation Velaro D. It currently runs on many services in Germany and through to other countries like France. Initially this train type was meant to execute the planned Deutsche Bahn services through the Channel Tunnel to London. As the trains had not received a certification for running in Belgium and due to the competition of budget airlines the London service was cancelled.

In 2020 Deutsche Bahn placed an order with Siemens for 30 trains, and options for another 60, of the Velaro design and based on the previously procured ICE Class 407. Referenced by Siemens as Velaro MS ("multi-system"), these trains are called ICE 3neo by Deutsche Bahn and classified as 408. The trains are designed for operation at 320 km/h and were deployed at the end of 2022 on routes that use the Cologne – Frankfurt high speed line which is designed for operation at 300 km/h. After a production time of only 12 months including trial runs the first train was presented to journalists in February of 2022. At that occasion the order was increased by 43 trainsets, with all 73 trains supposed to be in service by early 2029. In May of 2023 Deutsche Bahn announced that it was calling the last 17 trains from the option, bringing the total order up to 90 trains.

In April 2025, the multisystem Class 406 trainsets were retired from service due to ongoing maintenance and reliability issues. They were already relegated to domestic services beforehand and replaced with Class 407 on international routes.

=== Fourth generation ===
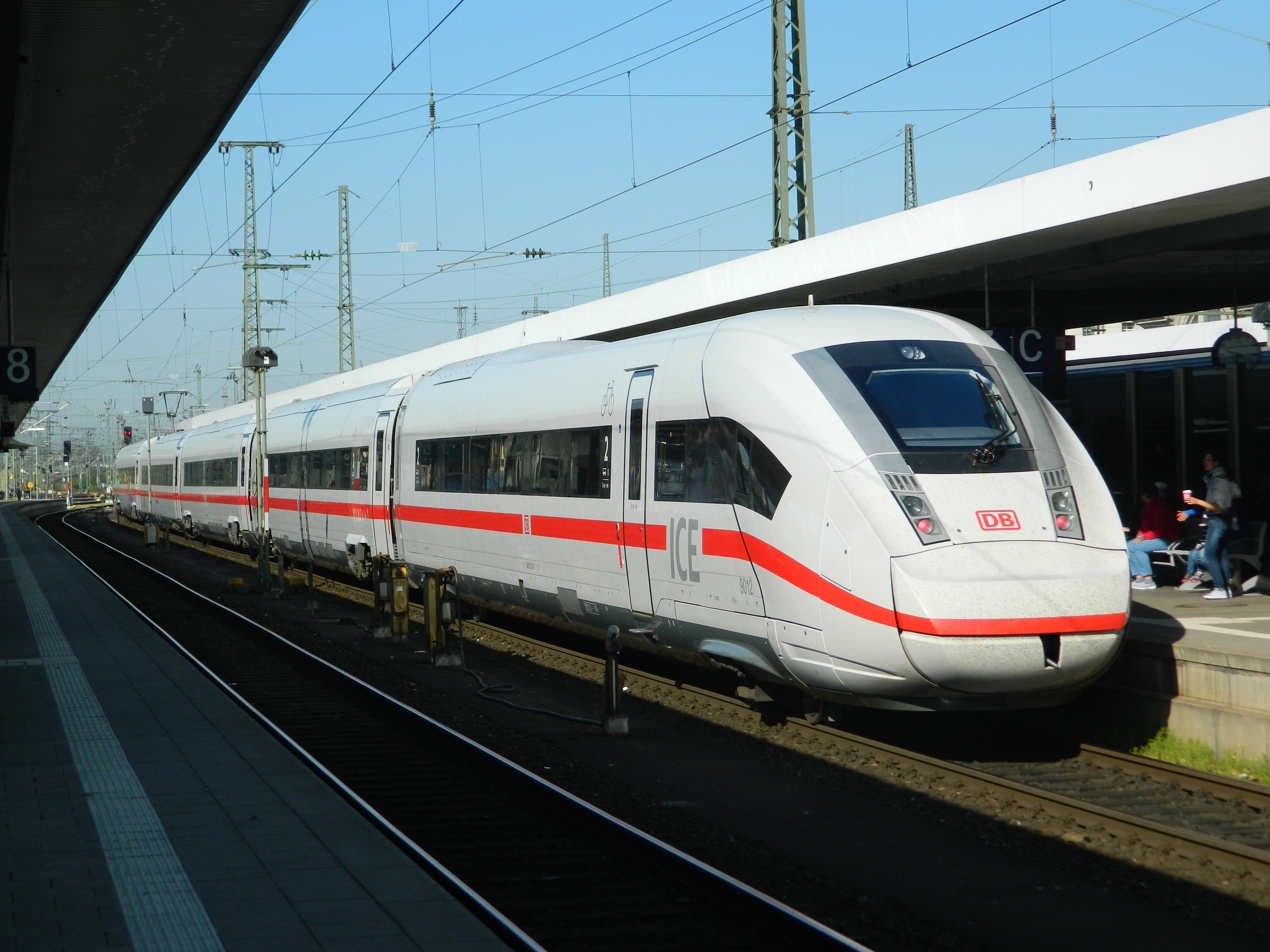
ICE 4 at Nürnberg Hauptbahnhof

Procurement of ICx trainsets started c. 2008 as replacements for locomotive hauled InterCity and EuroCity train services - the scope was later expanded to include replacements for ICE 1 and ICE 2 trainsets. In 2011 Siemens was awarded the contract for 130 seven car intercity train replacements, and 90 ten car ICE train replacements, plus further options - the contract for the ten car sets was modified in 2013 to expand the trainset length to twelve vehicles. The name ICx was used for the trains during the initial stages of the procurement; in late 2015 the trains were rebranded ICE 4, at the unveiling of the first trainset, and given the class designation 412 by Deutsche Bahn.

Two pre-production trainsets were manufactured and used for testing prior to the introduction of the main series.

=== ICE T and ICE TD ===
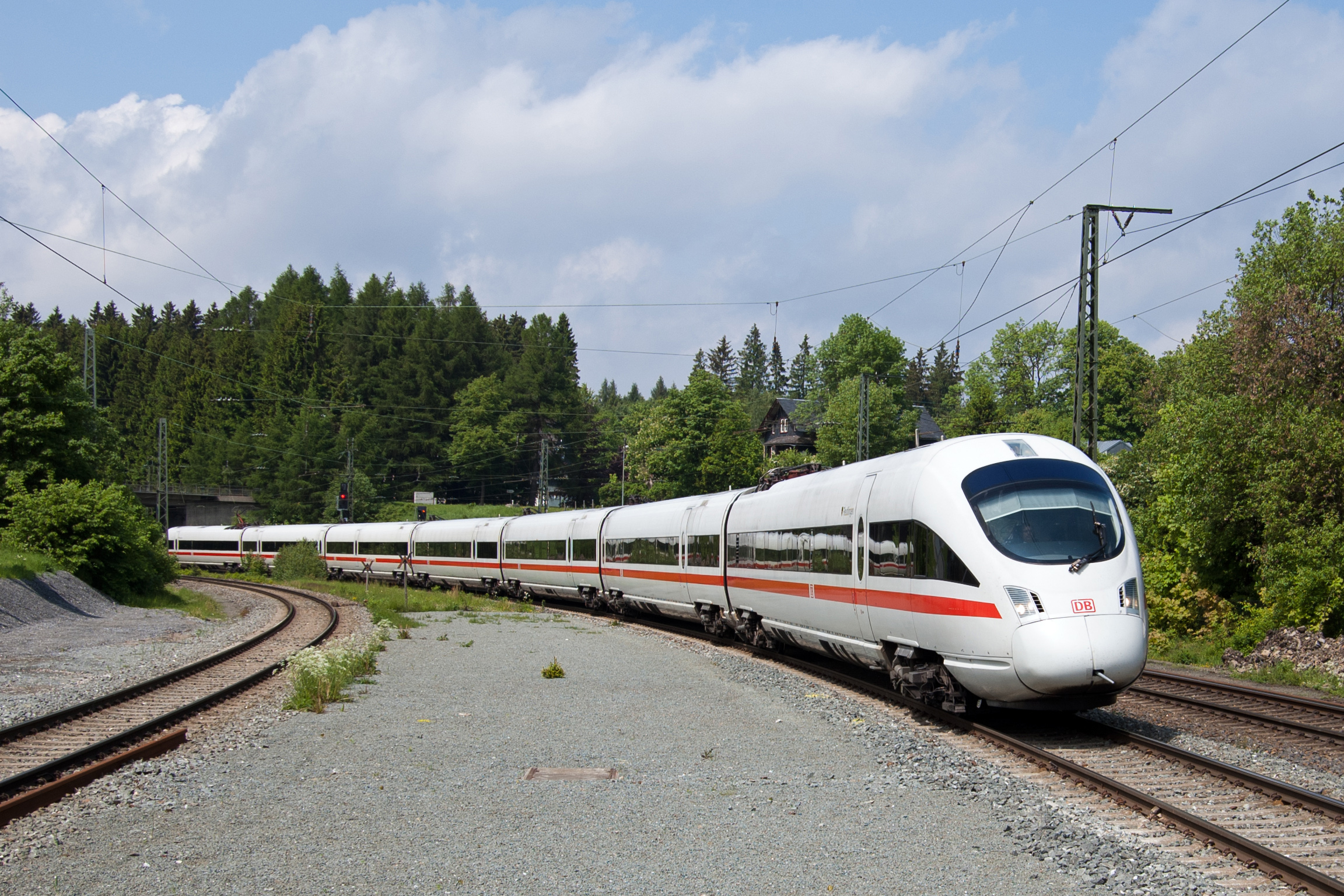
ICE T (Class 411) tilting train

Simultaneously with the ICE 3, Siemens developed trains with tilting technology, using much of the ICE 3 technical design. The class 411 (seven cars) and 415 (five cars) ICE T EMUs and class 605 ICE TD DMUs (four cars) were built with a similar interior and exterior design. They were specially designed for older railway lines not suitable for high speeds, for example the twisting lines in Thuringia. ICE-TD has diesel traction. ICE-T and ICE-TD could have been operated jointly, but this has not been done routinely.

==== ICE T ====
A total of 60 class 411 and 11 class 415 have been built so far (units built after 2004 belong to the modified second generation ICE-T2 batch). Both classes work reliably. Austria's ÖBB purchased three units in 2007, operating them jointly with DB. Even though DB assigned the name ICE-T to class 411/415, the T originally did not stand for tilting, but for Triebwagen (railcar), as DB's marketing department at first deemed the top speed too low for assignment of the InterCityExpress brand and therefore planned to refer to this class as IC-T (InterCity-Triebwagen). The trainsets of the T series were manufactured in 1999. The tilting system has been provided by Fiat Ferroviaria, now part of Alstom. ICE T trains can run at speeds of up to 230 km/h (143 mph).

In April 2025, Deutsche Bahn announced the gradual retirement of the 5-car Class 415 from June 2025.

==== ICE TD ====
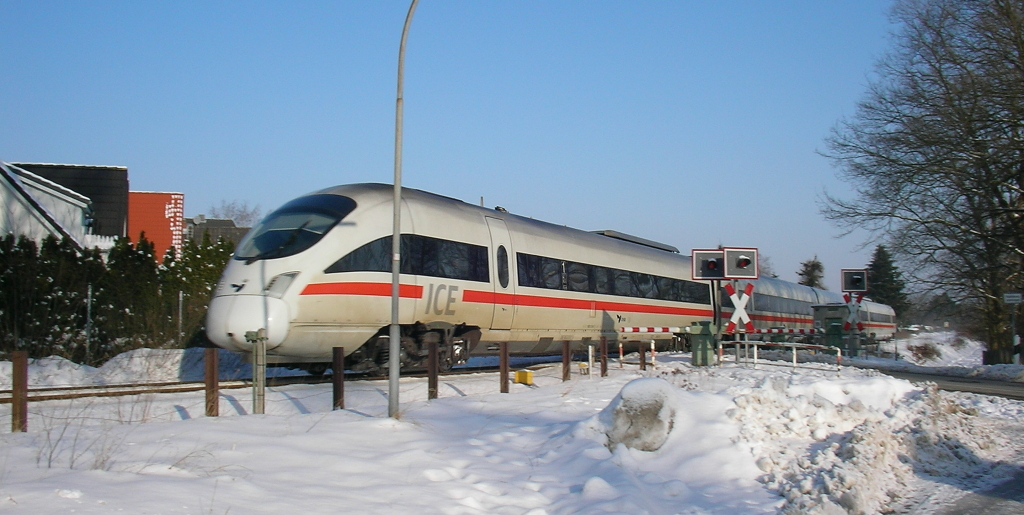
ICE TD in DB service in Northern Germany

Deutsche Bahn ordered 20 units of ICE-T with diesel engines in 2001, called Class 605 ICE-TD. The ICE-TD was intended for certain routes without electric overhead cables such as Dresden-Munich and Munich-Zürich lines. However, the Class 605 trains (ICE-TD) experienced many technical issues and unanticipated escalation in operating cost due to the diesel fuel being fully taxed in Germany. They were taken off revenue service shortly after delivery. During the 2006 FIFA World Cup, the ICE-TD trains were pressed temporarily into supplementary service for transporting fans between cities in Germany.

At the end of 2007, ICE-TD trains were put into revenue service for the lines between Hamburg and Copenhagen as well as Hamburg and Aarhus. A large part of the Danish railway network had not been electrified so DSB (Danish State Railways) used the diesel-powered trains. When DSB ordered the new IC4 train sets, the company did not anticipate the long delay with the delivery and the technical issues with the train sets. To compensate for the shortage of available trains, DSB leased the ICE-TD while the delivery and technical issues with IC4 were being addressed. The operating cost was much lower due to the lower fuel tax in Denmark. After the issues with IC4 were resolved, the ICE-TD fleet was removed from revenue service and stored.

Deutsche Bahn retired the entire ICE TD fleet in 2018.

=== Differences in train layouts ===
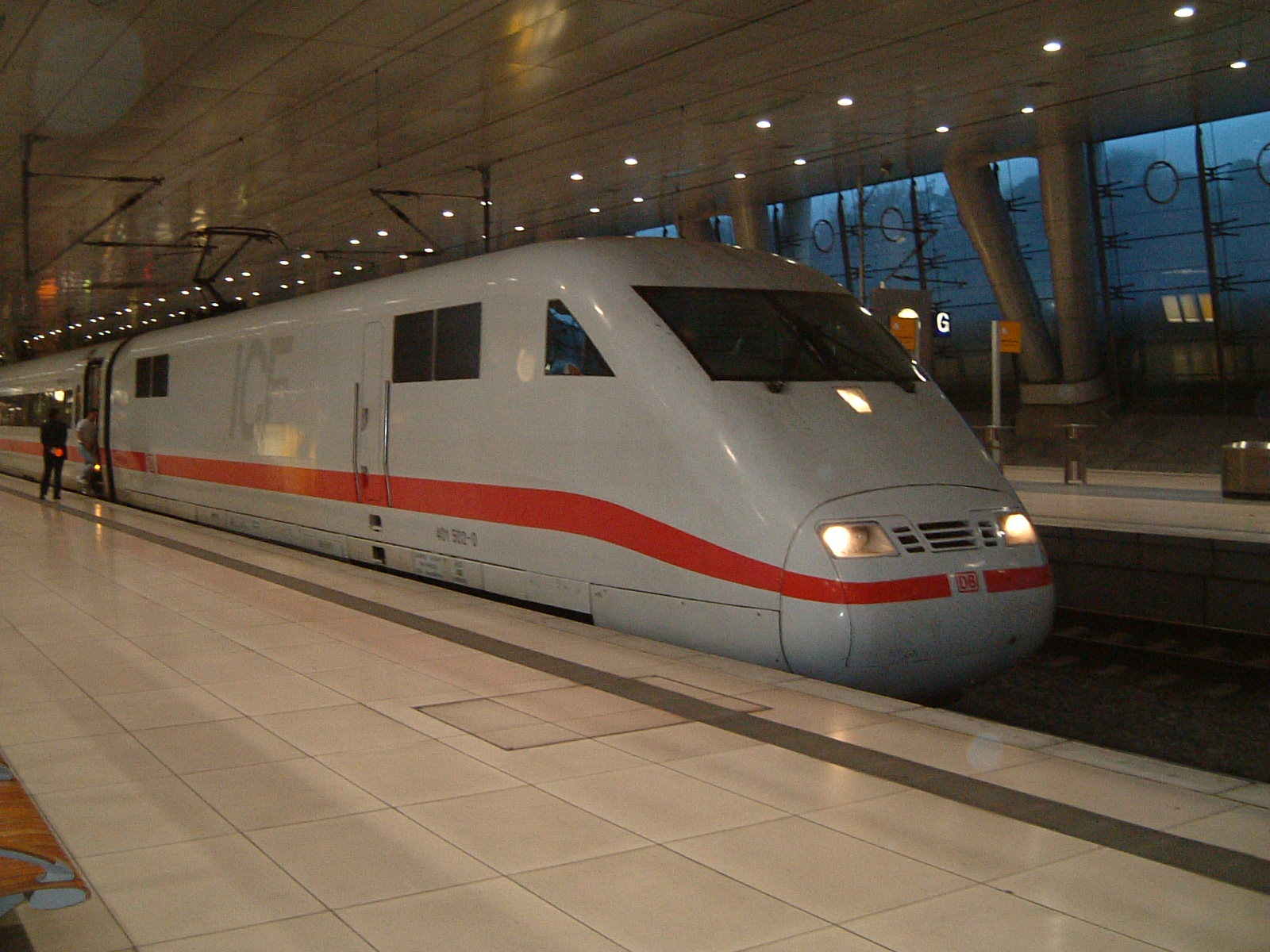
ICE 1 – in service since 1991

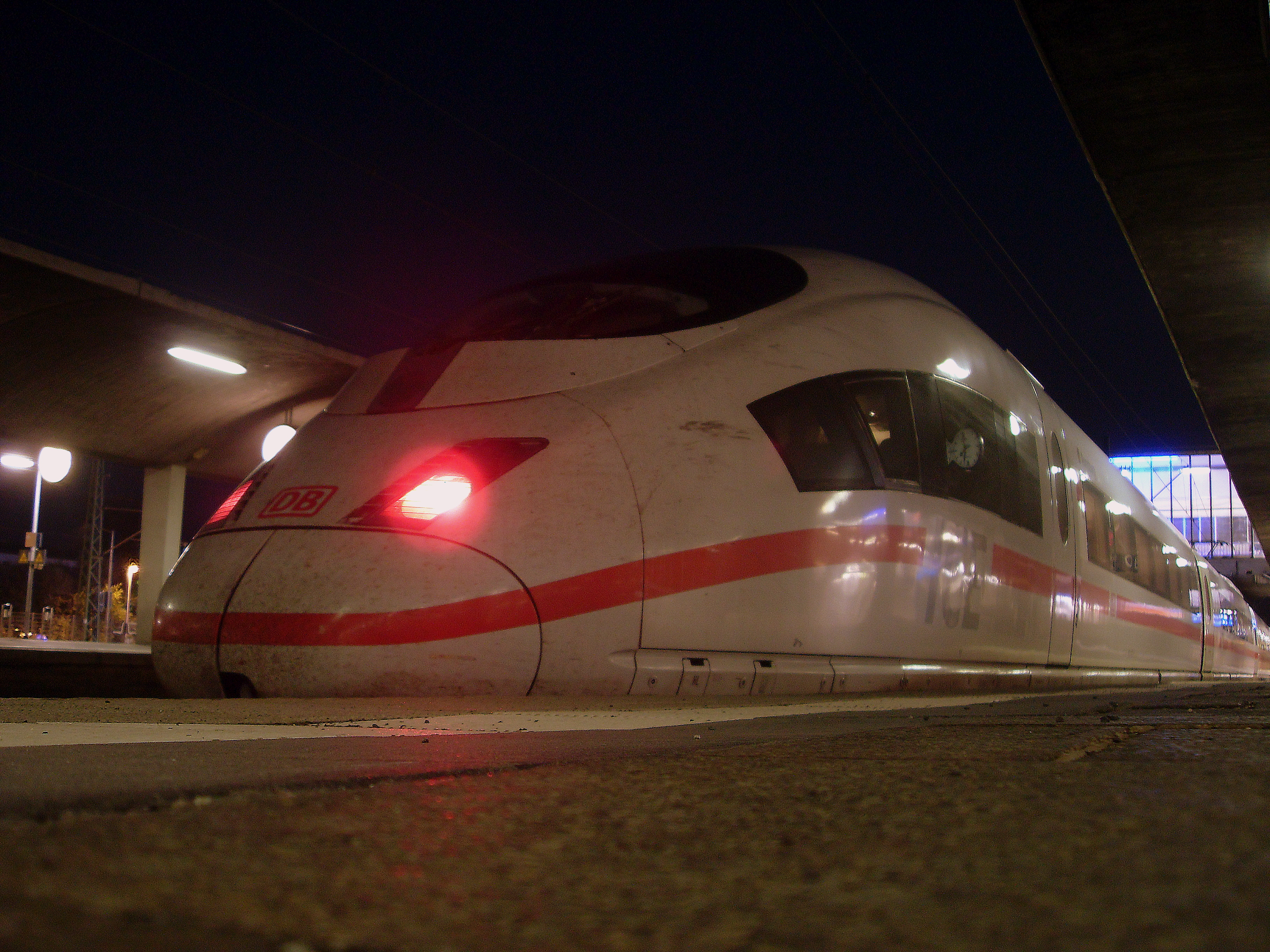
ICE 3 – a new design

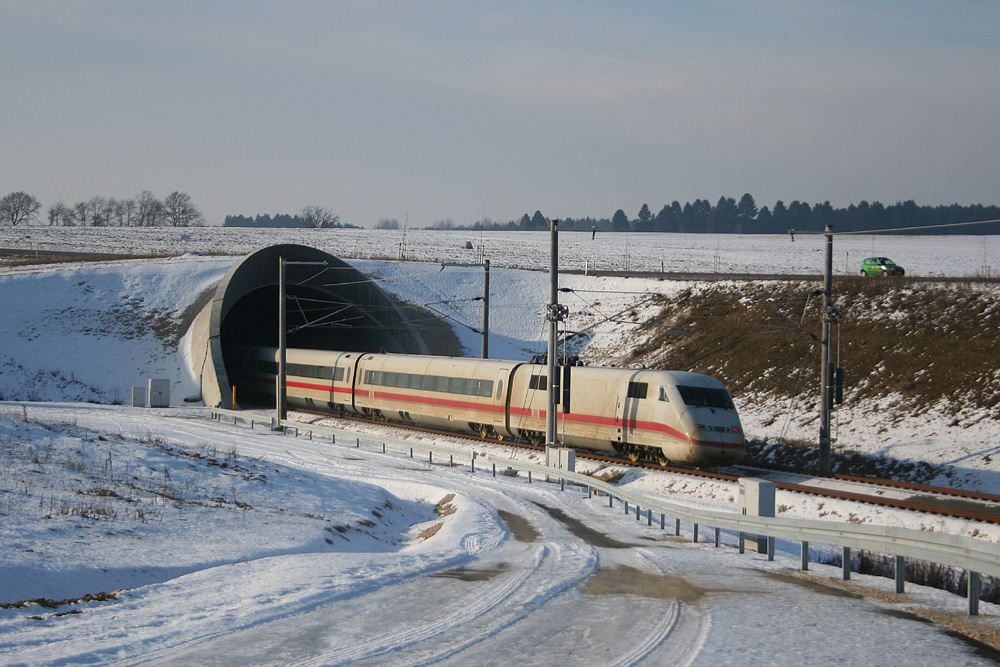
ICE S (successor of the ICE V)

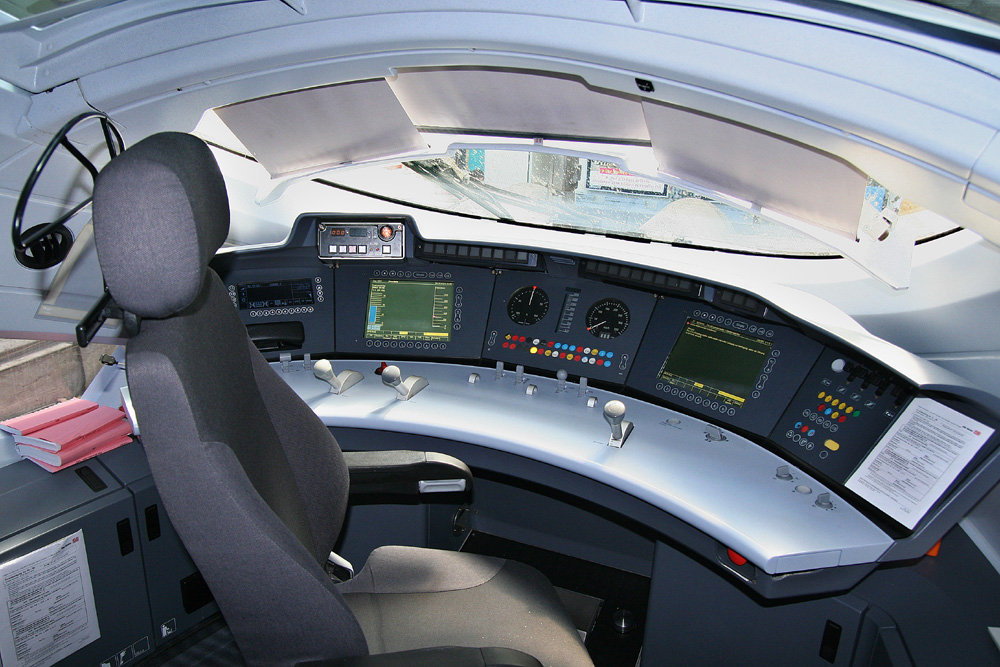
Inside the cab of an ICE 3

ICE (generally):	Pale grey livery with red stripe and convoluted rubber gaiters between carriages (distinctive from all other DB trains); Black window band with oval door windows except in ICE 4 (distinctive from Intercity / Metropolitan cars); Wheels-on-rails technology (distinctive from the Transrapid)
ICE 1:	two power heads and up to 14 intermediate cars; restaurant car with high roof; nose with DB logo that interrupts red stripe (unique to the ICE 1); maximum speed is 280 km/h (174 mph).
ICE 2:	one power head and one driving trailer accessible to passengers; BordRestaurant/Bistro car has same height as other cars; contrary to ICE 1: nose is vertically divisible, parts of the coupler protruding to the outside; maximum speed is 280 km/h (174 mph).
ICE 3:	no power heads, but an EMU: end cars with rounded windshield and passenger lounge, unpowered transformer car with pantograph; maximum speed of 330 km/h (205 mph); red stripe is interrupted at the end cars by ICE logo, then runs downwards and across the nose lid; window band becomes narrow and ends near the windshield.
ICE 4:	no power heads, unpowered transformer car with pantograph; maximum speed of 265 km/h (165 mph); no oval door windows; red stripe running downwards and across the nose lid; window band becomes narrow and ends near the windshield.
ICE T/ICE TD:	similar to ICE 3, except: steeper front; pantograph; maximum speed of 230 km/h (143 mph); no ICE logo on end coaches (ICE T)/ aerodynamic cover on end cars; maximum speed of 200 km/h (124 mph); ICE logo on the left side of the end coaches (ICE TD); red stripe stays straight; red stripe ends near the lamps; windows narrows to a point instead of a flat end as on the ICE 3
ICE T2:	like ICE T series 1, except: painted sheet metal instead of glass between windows, front lamps with LEDs
ICE V:	violet, wide stripe runs deeper than on newer stock and does not continue over the nose lid; Deutsche Bundesbahn logo and preliminary ICE logo; clad rubber gaiters; power heads larger than intermediate cars and with rounder front; front hedge ICE 2-like since 1995
ICE S:	ICE logo with additional letter "S" in white; most have only one intermediate coach; high-voltage lines between carriages; maximum speed is 330 km/h (205 mph)

=== Livery ===
A notable characteristic of the ICE trains is their colour design, which has been registered by the DB as an aesthetic model and hence is protected as intellectual property. The trains are painted in Pale Grey (RAL 7035) with a Traffic Red (RAL 3020) stripe on the lower part of the vehicle. The continuous black band of windows and their oval door windows differentiate the ICEs from any other DB train.

The ICE 1 and ICE 2 units originally had an Orient Red (RAL 3031) stripe, accompanied by a Pastel Violet stripe below (RAL 4009, 26 cm wide). These stripes were repainted with the current Traffic Red between 1998 and 2000, when all ICE units were being checked and repainted in anticipation of the EXPO 2000.

The "ICE" lettering uses the colour Agate Grey (RAL 7038), the frame is painted in Quartz Grey (RAL 7039). The plastic platings in the interior all utilise the Pale Grey (RAL 7035) colour tone.

Originally, the ICE 1 interior was designed in pastel tones with an emphasis on mint, following the DB colour scheme of the day. However, ICE 1 trains were refurbished in the mid-2000s and now follow the same design as the ICE 3, which makes heavy usage of indirect lighting and wooden furnishings.

The distinctive ICE design was developed by a team of designers around Alexander Neumeister in the early 1980s and first used on the InterCityExperimental (ICE V). The team around Neumeister then designed the ICE 1, ICE 2, and ICE 3/T/TD. The interior of the trains was designed by Jens Peters working for BPR-Design in Stuttgart. Among others, he was responsible for the heightened roof in the restaurant car and the special lighting. The same team also developed the design for the now discontinued InterRegio trains in the mid-1980s.

=== Trainset numbers ===
While every car in an ICE train has its own unique registration number, the trains usually remain coupled as fixed trainsets for several years. For easier reference, each has been assigned a trainset number that is printed over each bogie of every car. These numbers usually correspond with the registration numbers of the powerheads or cab cars.

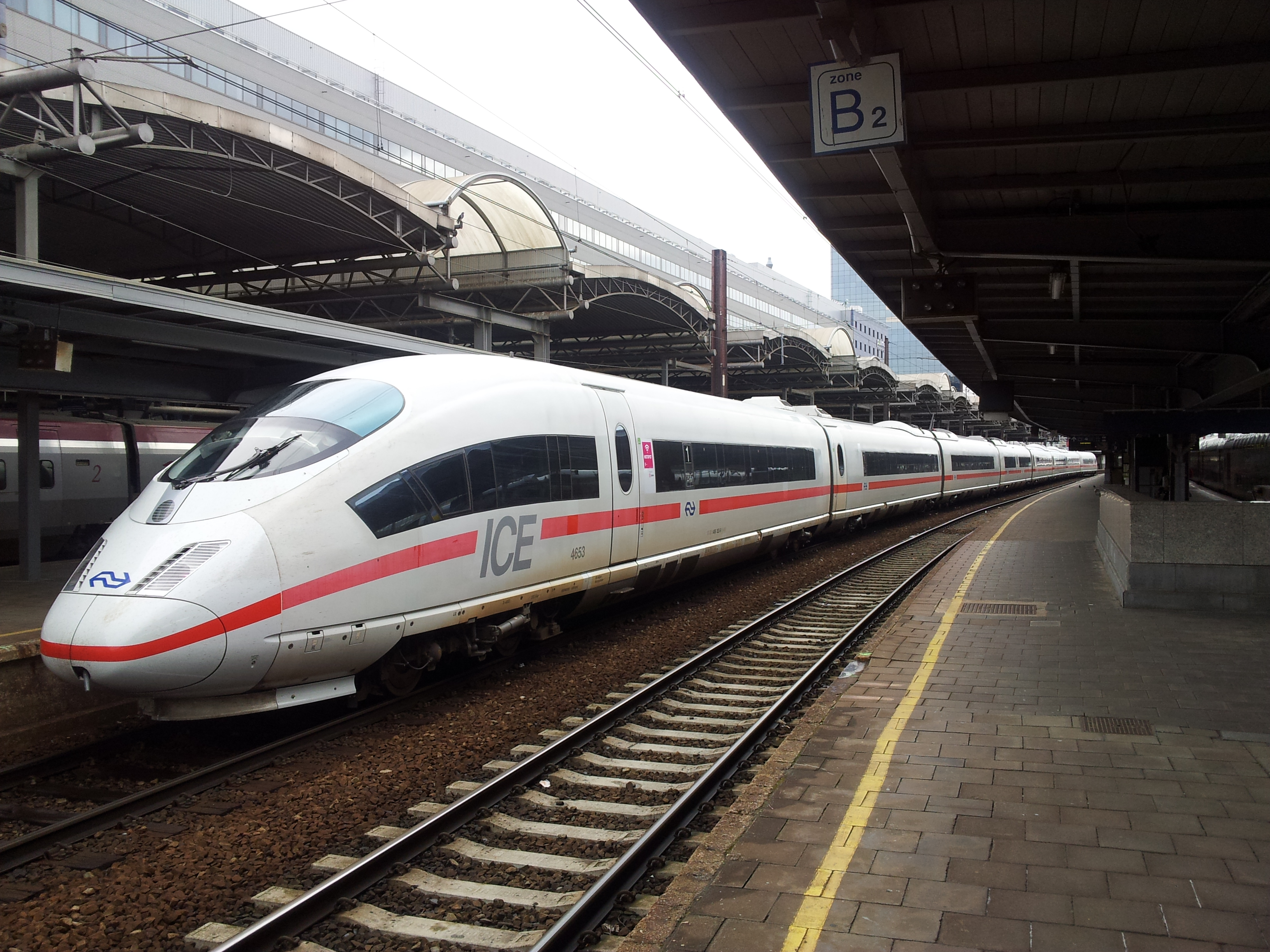
ICE 4653 owned by Nederlandse Spoorwegen at Brussels-South railway station

ICE 1:	Tz 01 to 20	traction motors use thyristor frequency converters
	Tz 51 to 71	traction motors use GTO frequency converters
	Tz 72 to 90	GTO control, fitted for service into Switzerland
ICE 2:	Tz 201 to 244
ICE 3:	Tz 301 to 337	first series
	Tz 351 to 367	second series
ICE 3M:	Tz 4601 to 4613	7 trainsets, numbers intermittent
	Tz 4651 to 4654	owned by Nederlandse Spoorwegen (NS)
ICE 3MF:	Tz 4680 to 4684	refitted for service into France
ICE 3MF:	Tz 4685	refitted for service into France, and the United Kingdom via the Channel Tunnel
ICE T:	Tz 1101 to 1132	first series
7 cars	Tz 1151 to 1178	second series
	Tz 1180 to 1184	refitted for service into Switzerland
	Tz 1190 to 1192	sold to ÖBB
ICE T:	Tz 1501 to 1506
5 cars	Tz 1520 to 1524	originally fitted for service into Switzerland, cab cars switched with Tz 1180 to 1184
ICE TD:	Tz 5501 to 5520

=== Interior equipment ===
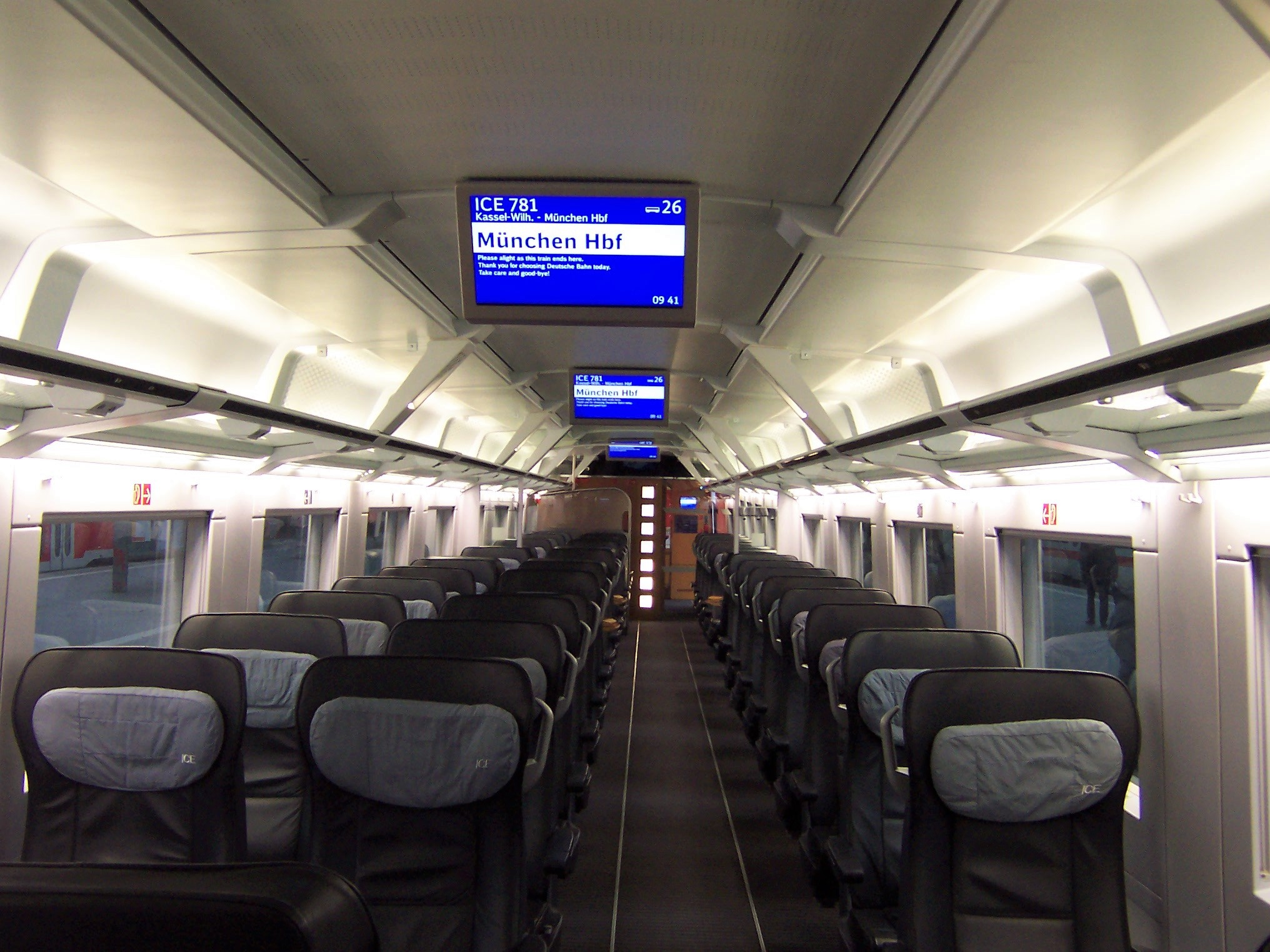
The refurbished 1st class interior of an ICE 1 trainset

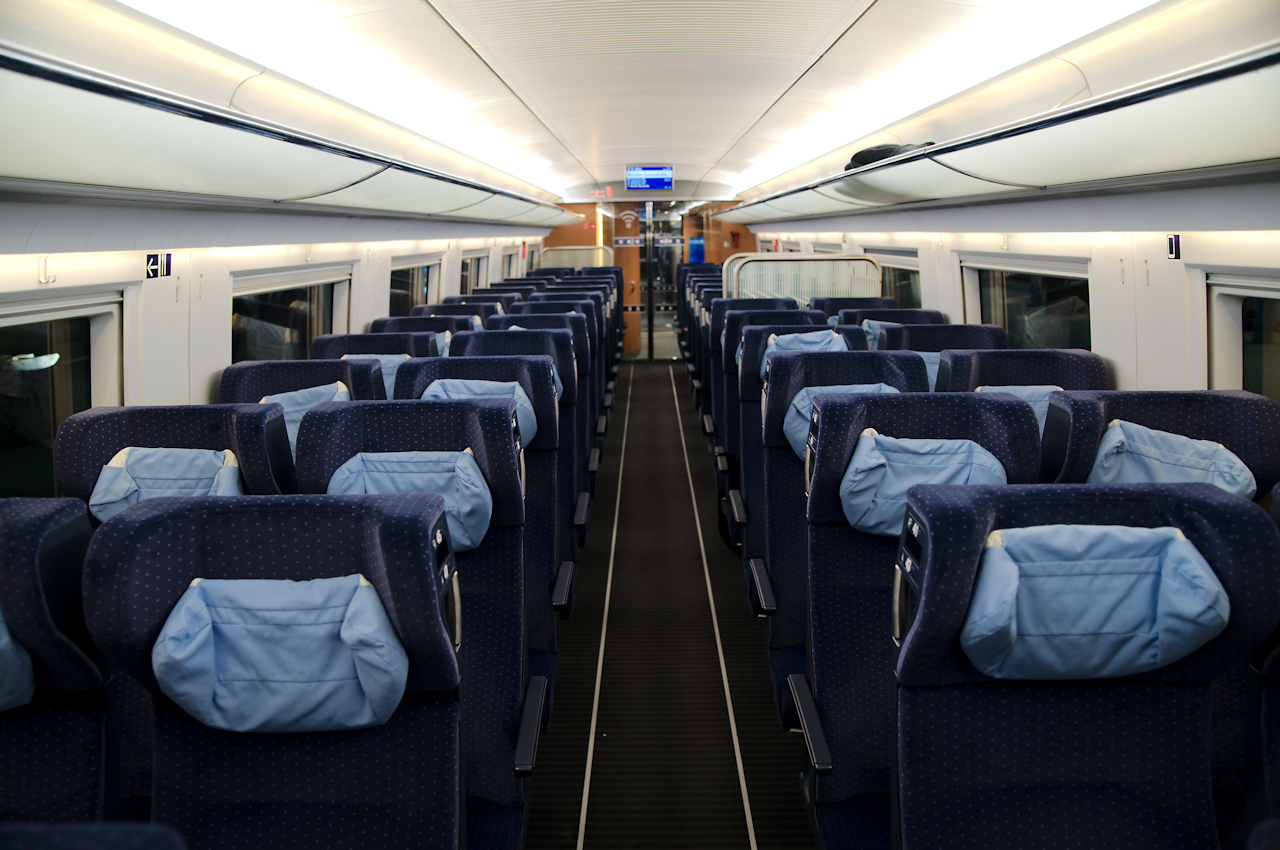
The refurbished 2nd class interior of an ICE 3 trainset

The ICE trains adhere to a high standard of technology: all cars are fully air-conditioned and nearly every seat features a headphone jack which enables the passenger to listen to several on-board music and voice programmes as well as several radio stations. Some seats in the 1st class section (in some trains also in 2nd class) are equipped with video displays showing movies and pre-recorded infotainment programmes. Each train is equipped with special cars that feature in-train repeaters for improved mobile phone reception as well as designated quiet zones where the use of mobile phones is discouraged. The newer ICE 3 trains also have larger digital displays in all coaches, displaying, among other things, Deutsche Bahn advertising, the predicted arrival time at the next destination and the current speed of the train.

The ICE 1 was originally equipped with a passenger information system based on BTX, but this system was eventually taped over and removed in the later refurbishment. The ICE 3 trains feature touch screen terminals in some carriages, enabling travellers to print train timetables. The system is also located in the restaurant car of the ICE 2.

The ICE 1 fleet saw a major overhaul between 2005 and 2008, supposed to extend the lifetime of the trains by another 15 to 20 years. Seats and the interior design were adapted to the ICE 3 design, electric sockets were added to every seat, the audio and video entertainment systems were removed and electronic seat reservation indicators were added above the seats. The ICE 2 trains have been undergoing the same procedure since 2010.

ICE 2 trains feature electric sockets at selected seats, ICE 3 and ICE T trains have sockets at nearly every seat.

The ICE 3 and ICE T are similar in their interior design, but the other ICE types differ in their original design. The ICE 1, the ICE 2 and seven-car ICE T (Class 411) are equipped with a full restaurant car. The five-car ICE T (Class 415) and ICE 3, however, have been designed without a restaurant, featuring a bistro coach instead. Since 1 October 2006, smoking is prohibited in the bistro coaches, similar to the restaurant cars, which have always been non-smoking.

All trains feature a toilet for disabled passengers and wheelchair spaces. The ICE 1 and ICE 2 have a special conference compartment whilst the ICE 3 features a compartment suitable for small children. The ICE 3 and ICE T omit the usual train manager's compartment and have an open counter named "ServicePoint" instead.

An electronic display above each seat indicates the locations between which the seat has been reserved. Passengers without reservations are permitted to take seats with a blank display or seats with no reservation on the current section.

=== Maintenance ===
The maintenance schedule of the trains is divided into seven steps:

1. Every 4,000 kilometres, an inspection taking about 1½ hours is undertaken. The waste collection tanks are emptied and fresh water tanks are refilled. Acute defects (e.g. malfunctioning doors) are rectified. Safety tests are also conducted. These include checking the pantograph pressure, cleaning and checking for fissures in the rooftop insulators, inspecting transformers and checking the pantograph's current collector for wear. The wheels are also checked in this inspection.
2. Every 20,000 kilometres, a 2½ hour inspection is conducted, called Nachschau. In this inspection, the brakes, the Linienzugbeeinflussung systems and the anti-lock brakes are checked.
3. After 80,000 kilometres, the train undergoes the Inspektionsstufe 1. During the two modules, each lasting eight hours, the brakes receive a thorough check, as well as the air conditioning and the kitchen equipment. The batteries are checked, as well as the seats and the passenger information system.
4. Once the train has reached 240,000 kilometres, the Inspektionsstufe 2 mandates a check of the electric motors, the bearings and the driveshafts of the bogies and the couplers. This inspection is usually carried out in two modules taking eight hours each.
5. About once a year (when reaching 480,000 km), the Inspektionsstufe 3 takes place, at three times eight hours each. In addition to the other checkup phases, it includes checks on the pneumatics systems, and the transformer cooling. Maintenance work is performed inside the passenger compartment.
6. The 1st Revision is carried out after 1.2 million km. It includes a thorough check of all components of the train and is carried out in two five-day segments.
7. The seventh and final step is the 2nd Revision, which happens when reaching 2.4 million kilometres. The bogies are exchanged for new ones and many components of the train are disassembled and checked. This step also takes two five-day segments.

Maintenance on the ICE trains is carried out in special ICE workshops located in Basel, Berlin, Cologne, Dortmund, Frankfurt, Hamburg, Leipzig and Munich. The train is worked upon at up to four levels at a time and fault reports are sent to the workshops in advance by the on-board computer system to minimize maintenance time.

== Lines in operation ==
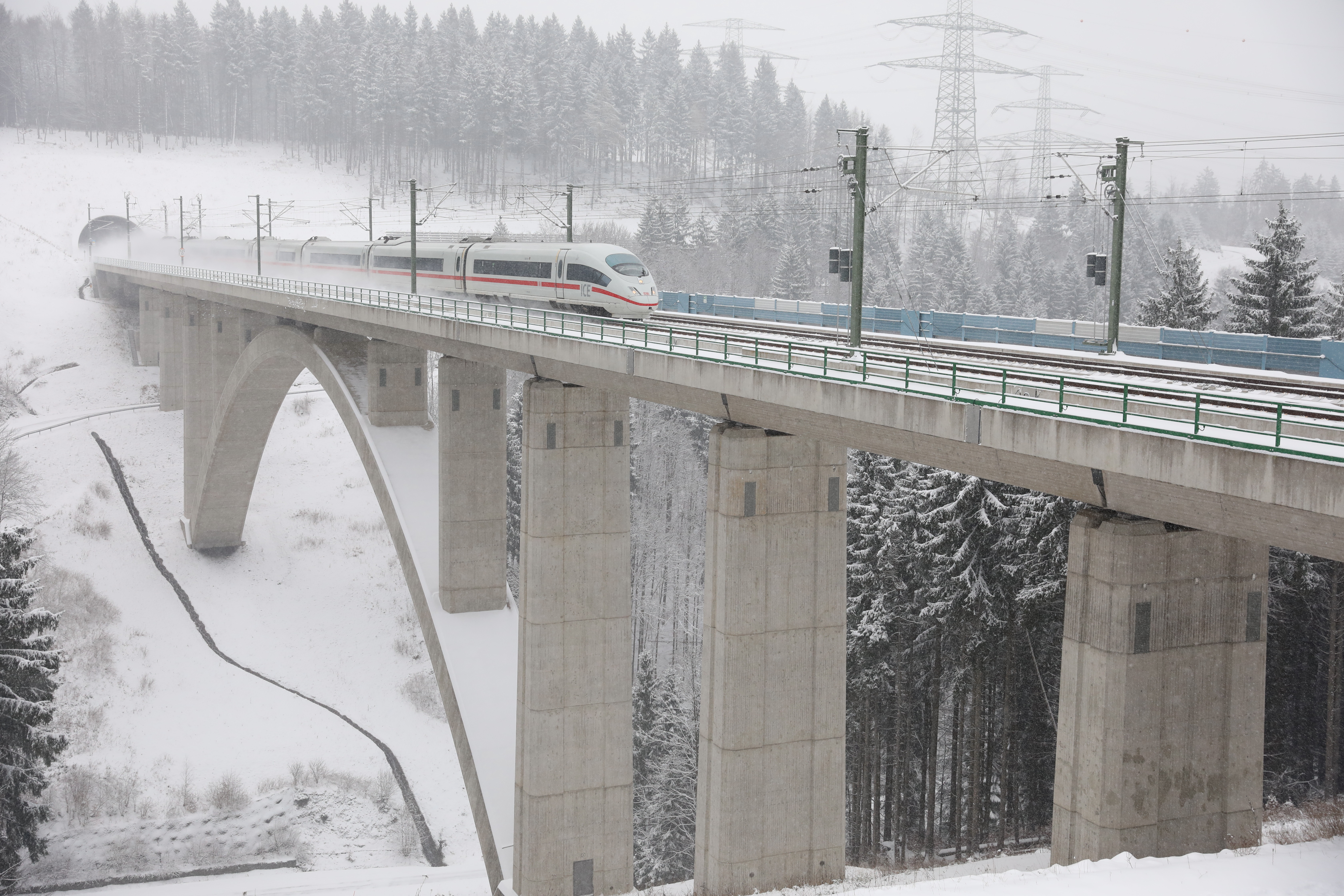
Third generation ICE running on the Nuremberg–Erfurt high-speed railway

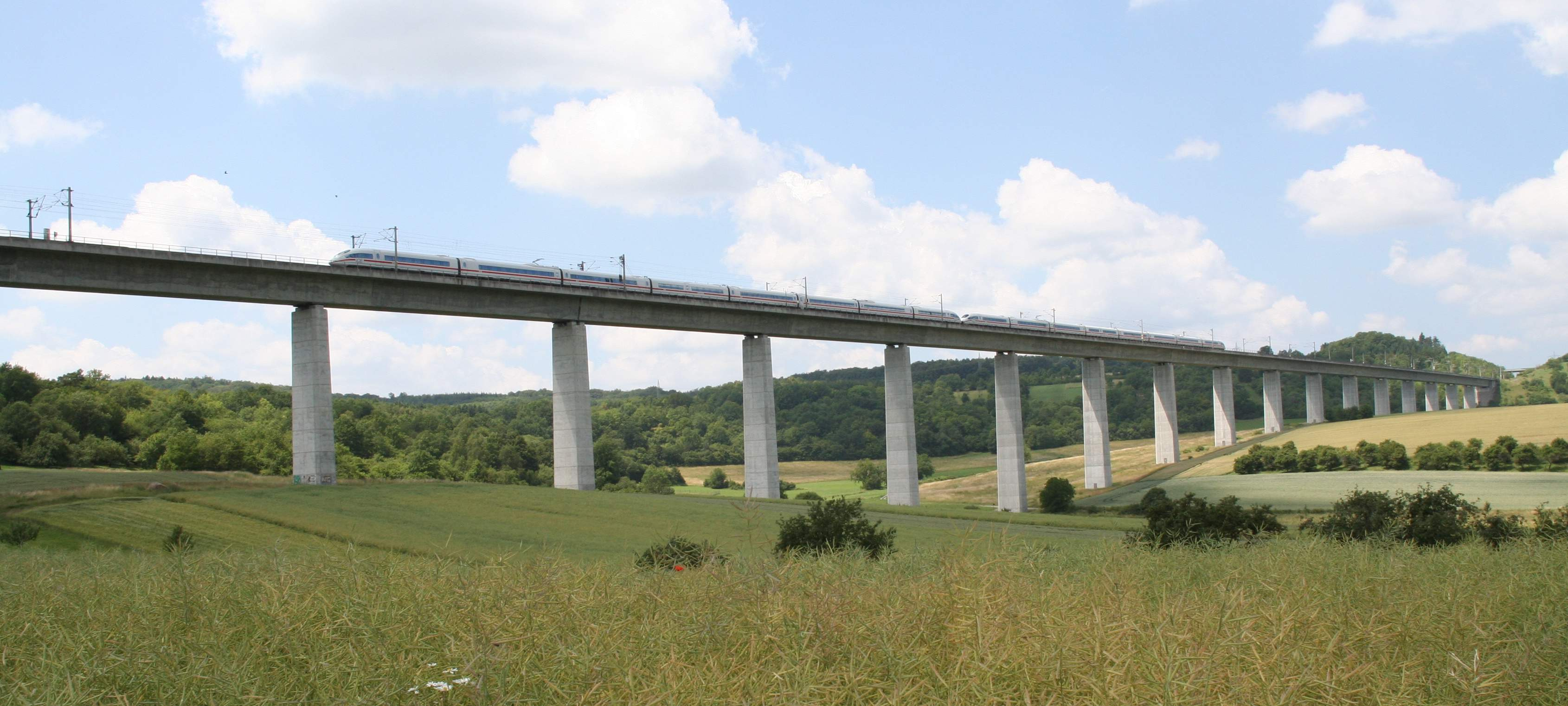
Bartelsgrabentalbrücke of the Hanover–Würzburg high-speed railway

Line	Section	Stations	Length		Top speed	Opened	Rolling stock
Line	Section	Stations	km	mi	Top speed	Opened	Rolling stock
Hanover–Würzburg high-speed railway			327	203	280 km/h	1991	
Mannheim–Stuttgart high-speed railway			99	62	280 km/h	9 May 1991	
Karlsruhe–Basel high-speed railway			182	113	250 km/h	March 1993	
Hanover–Berlin high-speed railway			258	160	250 km/h	15 September 1998	
Cologne–Frankfurt high-speed rail line		Frankfurt · Frankfurt Airport · Siegburg/Bonn	180	110	300 km/h	30 May 1999	
Cologne–Aachen high-speed railway		Cologne · Köln-Ehrenfeld · Horrem · Aachen Hbf	70	43	250 km/h	May 2002	
Nuremberg–Ingolstadt high-speed railway		Nürnberg · Allersberg · Kinding · Ingolstadt	78	48	300 km/h	2 September 2006	
Erfurt–Leipzig/Halle high-speed railway			123	77	300 km/h	9 December 2015	
Nuremberg–Erfurt high-speed railway			107	66	300 km/h	10 December 2017	
Vogelfluglinie	Copenhagen–Ringsted Line		60		200 km/h	31 May 2019	
Wendlingen–Ulm high-speed railway		Wendlingen · Merklingen · Ulm	59.575	37.018	250 km/h	9 December 2022	

=== Lines under construction ===
- Stuttgart–Wendlingen high-speed railway (new line, 250 km/h, under construction)
- Vogelfluglinie (partially new line, partially being upgraded)
  - Lübeck–Hamburg railway (German part, to be upgraded to reach 200 km/h)
  - Lübeck–Puttgarden railway (German part, to be electrified to reach 200 km/h up from the current 160 km/h, under construction)
  - Fehmarn Belt Fixed Link (tunnel part, will replace the Rødby–Puttgarden ferry, 200 km/h, under construction, completion expected in 2028)
  - Sydbanen (Danish part, new tracks to be laid by 2021, to be electrified to reach 200 km/h by 2024, under construction)

=== Lines planned ===
- Frankfurt–Mannheim high-speed railway (new line, 300 km/h, in planning)
- Hanau-Gelnhausen high-speed railway (new line, 300 km/h, in planning)
- Dresden‒Prague high-speed line
- Hanover-Bielefeld high-speed railway (new line, 300 km/h, in planning)
- Nuremberg-Würzburg high-speed railway (new line, 300 km/h, in planning)
- Hanover-Hamburg high-speed railway/Hanover-Bremen high-speed railway (Y-shaped, partially new line, 160 and 300 km/h on new sections, 160 km/h on an existing section, in planning)
- Fulda–Eisenach high-speed railway 250 km/h 2030 52 km
- Fulda–Frankfurt (parallel new) high-speed railway 250 km/h 2035 80 km
- Ostermünchen–Brannenburg–Austrian border high-speed railway

== Route planning and network layout ==
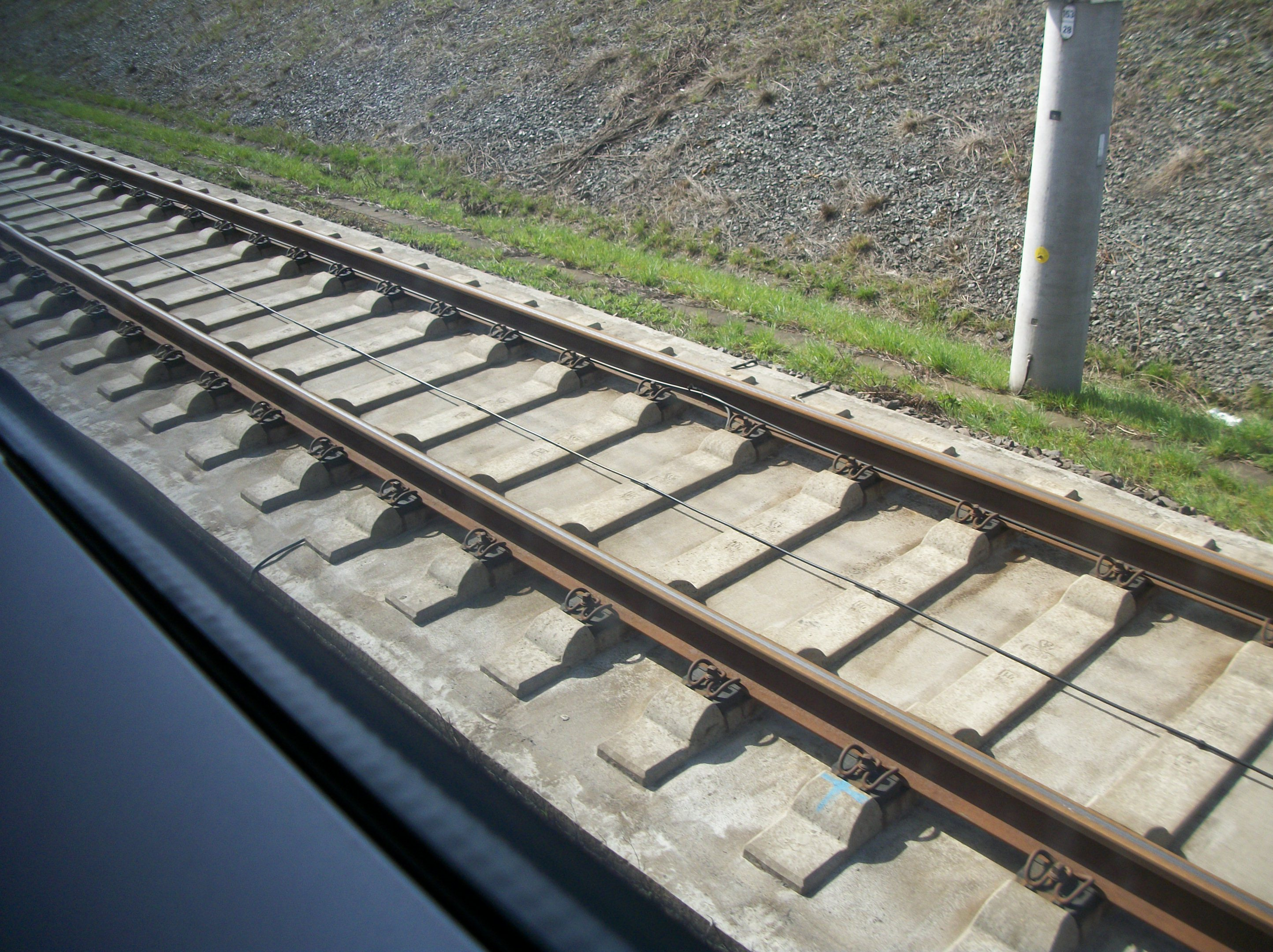
ICE track close up

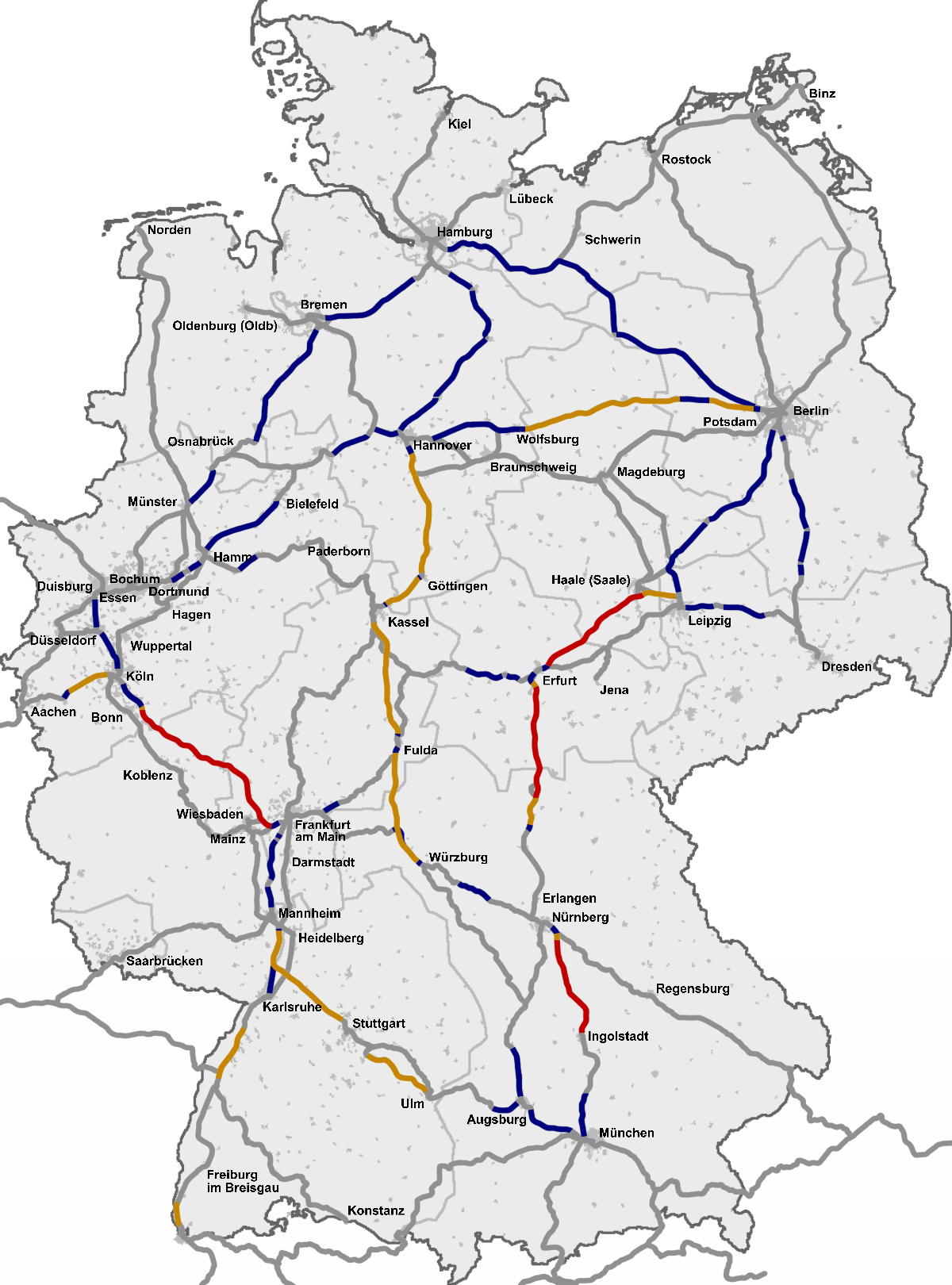
ICE network High-speed lines for 300 km/h (186 mph) High-speed lines for 250 km/h (155 mph) or more Upgraded lines for 200–230 km/h (124–143 mph) Conventional lines, often upgraded for 160 km/h (100 mph)

Similar to the above map, also showing frequencies

The ICE system is a polycentric network. Connections are offered in either 30-minute, hourly or bi-hourly intervals. Furthermore, additional services run during peak times, and some services call at lesser stations during off-peak times.

Unlike the French TGV or the Japanese Shinkansen systems, the vehicles, tracks and operations were not designed as an integrated whole; rather, the ICE system has been integrated into Germany's pre-existing system of railway lines instead. One of the effects of this is that the ICE 3 trains can reach a speed of 300 km/h (186 mph) only on some stretches of line and cannot currently reach their maximum allowed speed of 330 km/h on German railway lines (though a speed of 320 km/h is reached by ICE 3 in France).

The line most heavily utilised by ICE trains is the Mannheim–Frankfurt railway between Frankfurt and Mannheim due to the bundling of many ICE lines in that region. When considering all traffic (freight, local and long-distance passenger), the busiest line carrying ICE traffic is the Munich–Augsburg line, carrying about 300 trains per day.

=== North–south connections ===
The network's main backbone consists of six north–south lines:

1. from Hamburg-Altona via Hamburg, Hannover, Kassel, Fulda, Frankfurt, Mannheim, Karlsruhe and Freiburg to Basel (line 20) or continuing from Mannheim to Stuttgart (line 22)
2. from Hamburg-Altona and Hamburg and from Bremen to Hannover (where portions are joined) and via Kassel, Fulda and Würzburg to Nuremberg and via Ingolstadt to Munich (line 25)
3. from Hamburg-Altona via Hamburg, Berlin-Spandau, Berlin, Berlin Südkreuz, Leipzig or Halle, Erfurt to Nuremberg and via Augsburg or Ingolstadt to Munich (lines 18, 28 and 29) or continuing from Erfurt via Fulda, Frankfurt, Stuttgart, Ulm and Augsburg to Munich (line 11)
4. from Berlin via Berlin-Spandau, Braunschweig, Kassel, Fulda, Frankfurt, Mannheim, Karlsruhe and Freiburg to Basel (line 12) or via Fulda and Frankfurt Süd to Frankfurt Airport (line 13)
5. from Amsterdam or Dortmund via Duisburg, Düsseldorf, Cologne and Frankfurt Airport to Mannheim and either via Karlsruhe and Freiburg to Basel (line 43) or via Stuttgart, Ulm and Augsburg to Munich (lines 42 and 47)
6. from Essen via Cologne, Frankfurt, Würzburg, Nuremberg and Ingolstadt to Munich (line 41)

(Also applies to trains in the opposite directions, taken from 2024 network map)

=== East–west connections ===
Furthermore, the network has three main east–west thoroughfares:

1. from Berlin Gesundbrunnen via Berlin, Hannover, Bielefeld to Hamm (where train portions are split) and continuing either via Dortmund, Essen, Duisburg and Düsseldorf to Cologne/Bonn Airport or via Hagen and Wuppertal to Cologne (10, 19)
2. from Dresden via Leipzig, Erfurt, Fulda, Frankfurt, Frankfurt Airport and Mainz to Wiesbaden (50)
3. from Karlsruhe via Stuttgart, Ulm, and Augsburg to Munich (60)

(Also applies to trains in the opposite directions, taken from 2023 network map)

=== German branch lines ===
Some train lines extend past the core network and branch off to serve the following connections:

1. from Berlin to Rostock (line 28, individual services)
2. from Berlin to Stralsund (line 28, individual services)
3. from Hamburg to Lübeck (line 25, individual services)
4. from Hamburg to Kiel (lines 20, 22, 28 and 31, individual services)
5. from Bremen to Oldenburg (lines 10, 22 and 25, individual services)
6. from Leipzig via Hanover to Cologne (line 50, individual services)
7. from Leipzig via Kassel to Düsseldorf (line 50, individual services)
8. from Würzburg via Kassel to Essen (line 41, individual services)
9. from Munich to Garmisch-Partenkirchen (lines 25, 28 and 41, individual services)
10. from Nuremberg via Regensburg to Passau (line 91, every two hours)

(Also applies to trains in the opposite directions)

=== ICE Sprinter ===
The "ICE Sprinter" trains are trains with fewer stops between Germany's major cities running in the morning and evening hours. They are tailored for business travellers or long-distance commuters and are marketed by DB as an alternative to domestic flights. Some of the Sprinter services continue as normal ICE services after reaching their destination. The service is usually half an hour faster than a standard ICE between the same cities.

A reservation was mandatory on the ICE Sprinter until December 2015.

The first Sprinter service was established between Munich and Frankfurt in 1992. Frankfurt-Hamburg followed in 1993 and Cologne-Hamburg in 1994. This service ran as a Metropolitan service between December 1996 and December 2004. In 1998, a Berlin-Frankfurt service was introduced and a service between Cologne and Stuttgart ran between December 2005 and October 2006.

Until December 2006, a morning Sprinter service ran between Frankfurt and Munich (with an intermediate stop at Mannheim), taking 3:25 hours for the journey. This has been since replaced by a normal ICE connection taking only 3:21 hours.

Starting with the December 2017 schedule change, a new Sprinter line links Berlin main station and Munich main station in less than four hours.

As of July 2018, the individual ICE Sprinter lines are:

No.	Departure station	Intermediate stops	Destination	Travel time (hh:mm)	Time of day
11; 13; 17; 19; 121; 123; 125; 127; 129; 211; 215; 221	Köln Hbf	Frankfurt Airport	Frankfurt (Main) Hbf	1:01; 1:02; 1:03; 1:06	Morning; Noon; Afternoon; Evening; Night
14; 16; 120; 124; 126; 128; 210; 220	Frankfurt (Main) Hbf	Frankfurt Airport	Köln Hbf	1:06; 1:04; 1:10	Morning; Noon; Evening
591; 593; 595; 597; 599; 691; 695	Frankfurt (Main) Hbf	Mannheim Hbf	Stuttgart Hbf	1:18	Morning; Noon; Afternoon; Evening
590; 592; 594; 598; 690; 692; 694	Stuttgart Hbf	Mannheim Hbf	Frankfurt (Main) Hbf	1:17	Morning; Noon; Afternoon; Evening
1000; 1004; 1008	München Hbf	Nuremberg Hbf, Erfurt Hbf, Halle (Saale) Hbf, Berlin Südkreuz	Berlin Hbf	3:55	Morning; Noon; Evening
1001; 1005; 1009	Berlin Hbf	Berlin Südkreuz, Halle (Saale) Hbf, Erfurt Hbf, Nuremberg Hbf	München Hbf	4:02; 3:58	Morning; Noon; Evening
1031	Hamburg Hbf	Essen Hbf, Duisburg Hbf, Düsseldorf Hbf	Köln Hbf	3:35	Morning
1038	Köln Hbf	Düsseldorf Hbf, Duisburg Hbf, Essen Hbf	Hamburg Hbf	3:38	Morning
1094	Frankfurt Hbf	Hannover Hbf	Hamburg Hbf	3:26	Afternoon
1097	Hamburg-Altona	Hamburg Hbf, Hamburg Dammtor, Hannover Hbf	Frankfurt Hbf	3:20	Morning
1533; 1535; 1598; 1631; 1633	Frankfurt (Main) Hbf	Erfurt Hbf, Halle (Saale) Hbf, Berlin Südkreuz	Berlin Hbf	3:56; 3:53	Morning; Noon; Afternoon; Evening
1536; 1538; 1636; 1638	Berlin Hbf	Berlin Südkreuz, Halle (Saale) Hbf, Erfurt Hbf	Frankfurt (Main) Hbf	3:52; 3:54	Morning; Noon; Afternoon; Evening

(Source: Deutsche Bahn AG)

=== Line segments abroad ===
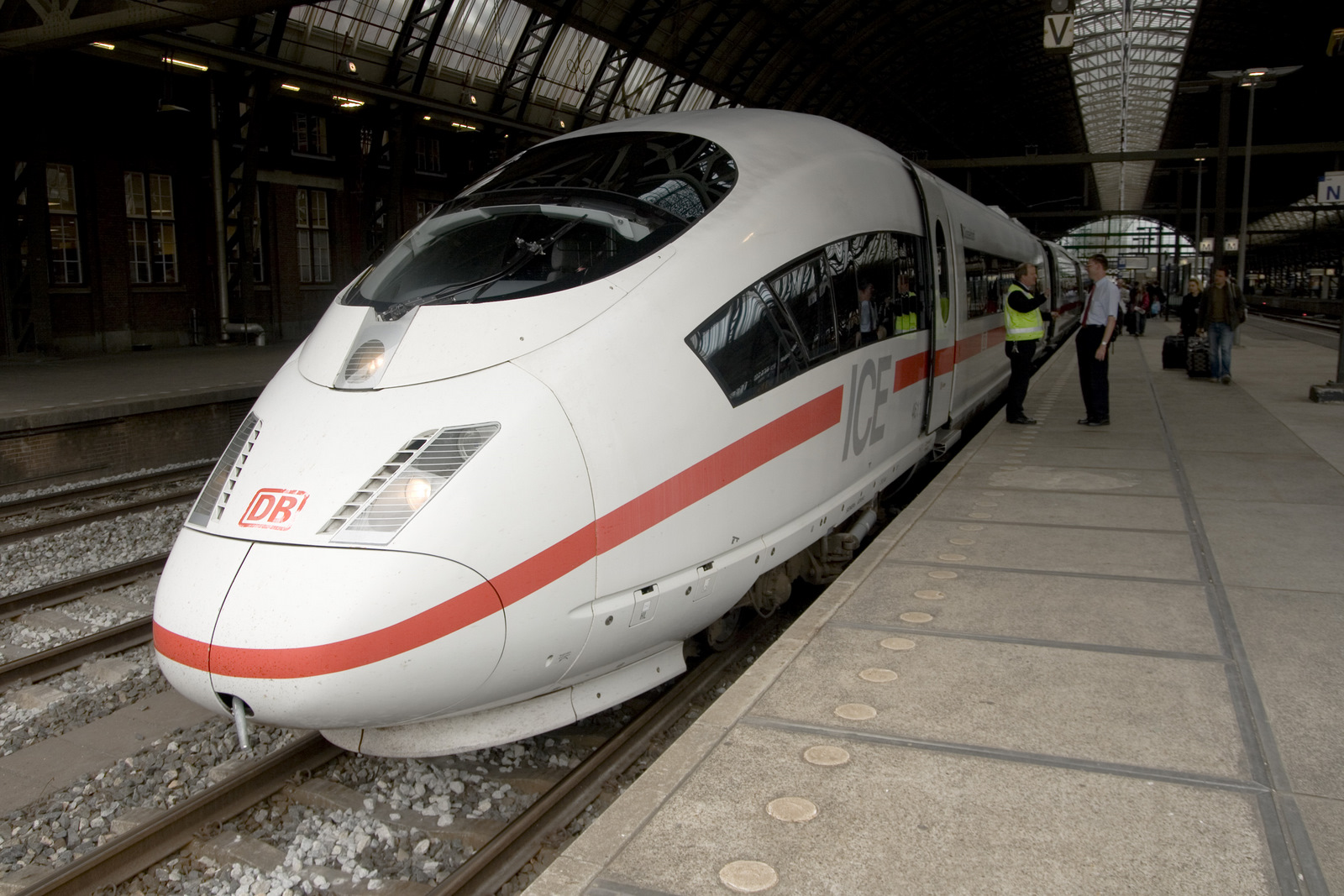
ICE train at Amsterdam Central station

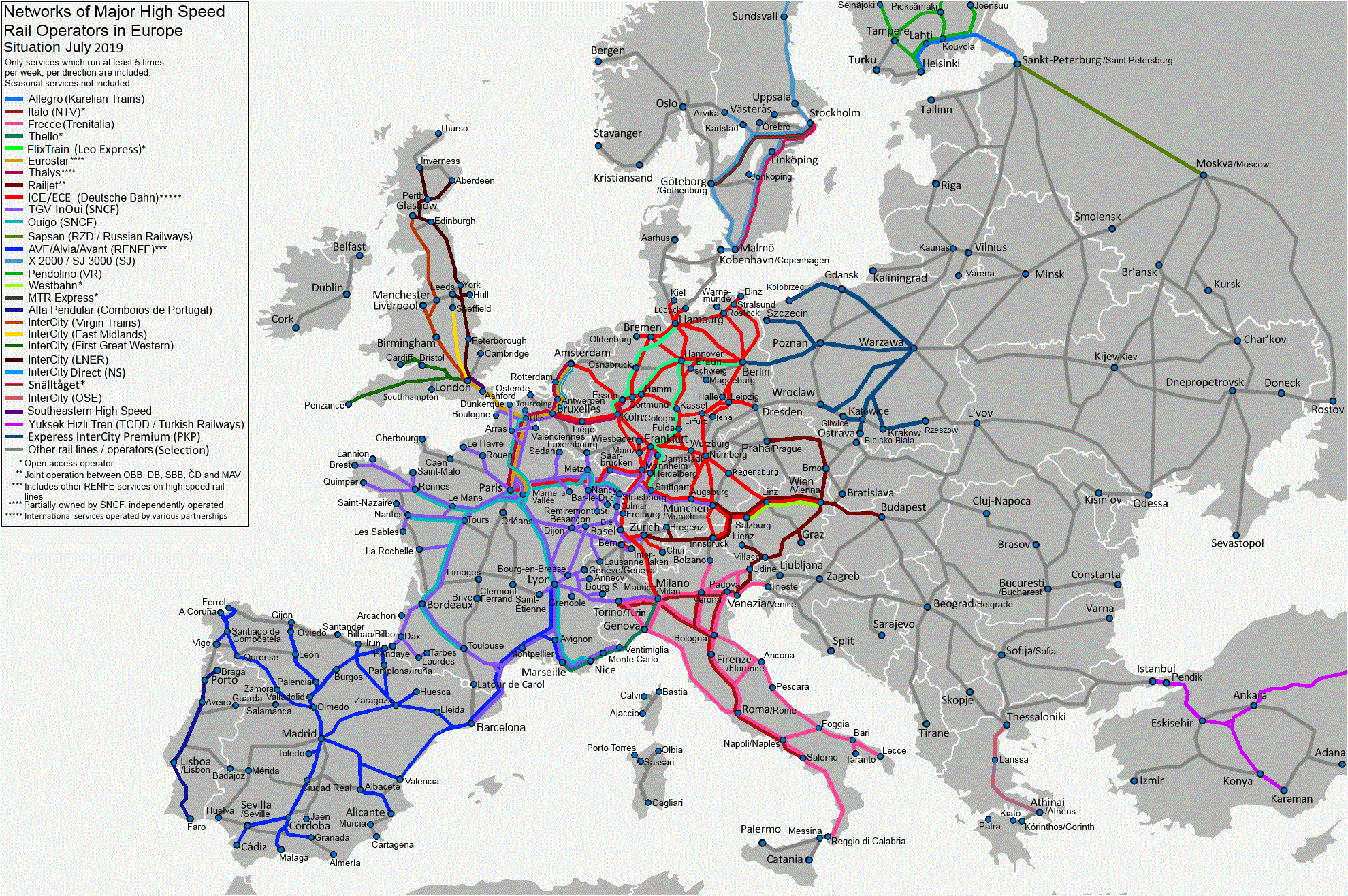
The ICE network is an integral part of Europe's high-speed rail system.

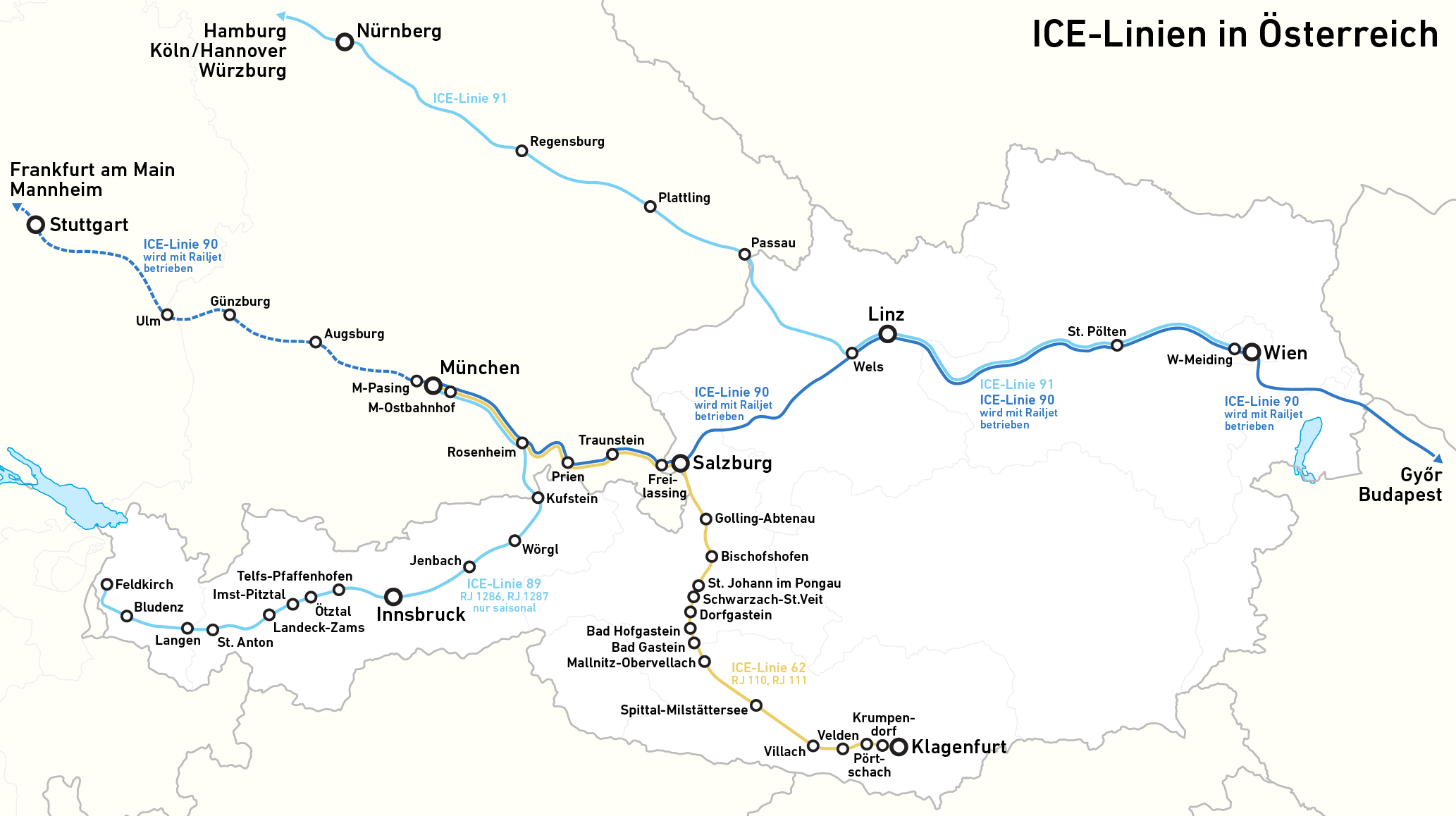
Lines to and in Austria

Some ICE trains also run on services abroad – sometimes diverting from their original lines.

1. from Frankfurt Hbf to Amsterdam Centraal (Netherlands) via Köln Hbf, Duisburg Hbf and Arnhem Centraal (lines 120, 122, 128, 126, 220, 222/121, 123, 127, 129, 221)
2. from Frankfurt Hbf to Bruxelles-Midi/Brussel-Zuid (Belgium) via Köln Hbf, Aachen Hbf and Liège-Guillemins (lines 10, 12, 14, 18, 16, 314, 316/11, 13, 15, 17, 19, 315, 317)
3. from Frankfurt Hbf and Stuttgart Hbf to Paris Est (France) via Karlsruhe Hbf and Strasbourg-Ville (lines 9568, 9572, 9574/9563, 9567, 9571, 9573)
4. from Frankfurt Hbf to Paris Est via Saarbrücken Hbf (lines 9550, 9556, 9558/9553, 9555)
5. from Hamburg-Altona, Kiel Hbf and Ostseebad Binz to Basel SBB and Zürich HB (Switzerland) via Frankfurt Hbf and Karlsruhe (lines 73, 75, 77, 79, 203, 205/72, 74, 76, 78, 272)
6. from Frankfurt Hbf and Hamburg-Altona to Chur (Switzerland) via Karlsruhe, Basel SBB and Zürich HB (lines 271, 1271/70)
7. from Frankfurt Hbf, Berlin Hbf and Hamburg-Altona station to Interlaken (Switzerland) via Karlsruhe and Basel SBB (lines 275, 373/278, 376)
8. from Frankfurt Hbf and Dortmund Hbf to Wien Hbf (Austria) via Nürnberg Hbf, Passau Hbf and Linz Hbf (lines 21, 23, 27, 29, 229/20, 22, 26, 28, 228)
9. from Hamburg-Altona to Wien Hbf (Austria) via Berlin Hbf, Nürnberg Hbf, Passau Hbf and Linz Hbf (lines 93, 95/92, 94)
10. from Dortmund Hbf to Innsbruck Hbf (Austria) via Köln Hbf, Stuttgart Hbf, Lindau-Reutin and Bregenz Hbf (line 119), return schedule terminates at Münster Hbf (line 118)
11. from Berlin Hbf to Paris Est (France) via Frankfurt, Karlsruhe and Strasbourg (line 9590/ 9591)
12. from Berlin Hbf to Innsbruck Hbf (Austria) via Würzburg Hbf, Stuttgart Hbf, Lindau-Reutin and Bregenz Hbf (alternative route for lines 118/119)
13. from Münster Hbf to Klagenfurt Hbf (Austria) via Köln, Stuttgart, Munich Hbf and Salzburg Hbf (line 115), return schedule terminates at Dortmund Hbf (line 114)
14. from Berlin Hbf to Innsbruck Hbf (Austria) via Frankfurt, Stuttgart and Munich (line 1211/1218)
15. from Amsterdam Centraal (Netherlands) to Basel SBB (Switzerland) via Frankfurt Hbf (line 105/104)

(Also applies to the opposite directions)

Since December 2006, Stuttgart Hbf and Zürich HB have been connected by a bi-hourly service. This service, however, has been replaced by a daily Intercity service since March 2010.

The ÖBB in Austria also uses two ICE T trainsets (classified as ÖBB Class 4011) between Wien Hauptbahnhof, Innsbruck Hauptbahnhof and Bregenz (without stops in Germany), although they do not use tilting technology. Since December 2007 ÖBB and DB offer a bi-hourly connection between Wien Westbf and Frankfurt Hbf. On 12 December 2021 a new Railjet schedule was introduced by ÖBB between Frankfurt and Vienna on a different route via Stuttgart, Ulm, Biberach, Friedrichshafen, Lindau, Bregenz and Innsbruck. Since 11 June 2023 a new ICE service is operated by Deutsche Bahn via the same route between Dortmund and Innsbruck on ICE 4 trains replacing the IC 118/119 service.

Since June 2007 ICE 3M trains had been running between Frankfurt Hbf and Paris Est via Saarbrücken and Kaiserslautern. Together with the TGV-operated service between Paris Est and München Hbf via Stuttgart Hbf (TGV 9576/9577), this ICE line was part of the "LGV Est européenne", also called "Paris-Ostfrankreich-Süddeutschland" (or POS) for short, a pan-European high-speed line between France and Germany. This service now co-exists with a direct TGV service (TGV 9551/9552).

From late 2007, ICE TD trains linked Berlin Hbf with Copenhagen and Aarhus via Hamburg Hbf. These services have been operated since December 2017 by Danish IC3 sets as EuroCity services.

A EuroCity-Express service was introduced between Munich and Zürich in December 2020 with the completion of the electrification of the line in Germany, replacing a EuroCity service. Six pairs of trains run every two hours and are operated by Swiss Federal Railways with Alstom ETR 610 (Astoro) sets. So far no ICE trains are scheduled on this route.

Since December 2024 direct ICE trains are running between Berlin Hbf and Paris Est via Frankfurt Hbf, Karlsruhe Hbf and Strasbourg-Ville.

In addition, ICE Trains to London via the Channel Tunnel are on the horizon. Unique safety and security requirements for the tunnel (such as airport-style checks at stations) as well as hold-ups in the production of the Velaro-D trains to be used on the route have delayed these plans.

=== Intra-Swiss ICE trains ===
To avoid empty runs or excess waits, several services exist that operate exclusively inside Switzerland:

- three services from Basel SBB to Interlaken Ost
- two services from Basel SBB to Zürich HB
- three services from Interlaken Ost to Basel SBB
- one service from Interlaken Ost to Bern
- two services from Zürich HB to Basel SBB
- one service from Bern to Interlaken Ost

These trains, despite being officially notated as ICEs, are more comparable to a Swiss InterRegio or RegioExpress train, calling at small stations like Möhlin or Sissach. As common in Switzerland, these trains can be used without paying a supplement.

== Travel times ==
DB Intercity Express travel times between major stations^{1, 2}
	Amsterdam	Berlin	Brussels	Cologne	Dortmund	Düsseldorf	Frankfurt	Hamburg	Innsbruck	Munich	Paris	Stuttgart	Vienna	Zürich
Amsterdam Centraal ^{4}		5h 45min	—N/a	2h 37min	—N/a	2h 11min	3h 55min	—N/a	—N/a	7h 09min	—N/a	5h 03min	—N/a	—N/a
Berlin Hbf ^{5}	5h 45min		—N/a	4h 12min	3h 25min	4h 14min	3h 52min^{3}	1h 42min	—N/a	3h 58min^{3}	8h 01min	5h 04min	7h 43min	—N/a
Brussels Midi/Zuid	—N/a	—N/a		1h 50min	—N/a	—N/a	3h 05min	—N/a	—N/a	—N/a	—N/a	—N/a	—N/a	—N/a
Cologne/Köln Hbf ^{5}	2h 37min	4h 17min	1h 50min		1h 10min	21min	1h 01min^{3}	3h 38min^{3}	—N/a	4h 32min	—N/a	2h 13min	8h 52min	—N/a
Dortmund Hbf	—N/a	3h 28min	—N/a	1h 17min		49min	2h 26min^{3}	2h 49min	11h 12min	5h 35min	—N/a	3h 29min	10h 07min	—N/a
Düsseldorf Hbf	2h 11min	4h 14min	—N/a	21min	48min		1h 26min	3h 06min	—N/a	4h 41min	—N/a	2h 28min	—N/a	—N/a
Frankfurt (Main) Hbf ^{5}	3h 55min	3h 39min^{3}	3h 05min	1h 04min^{3}	2h 35min	1h 26min		3h 20min^{3}	—N/a	3h 09min	3h 38min^{3}	1h 18min^{3}	6h 24min	3h 53min
Hamburg Hbf ^{5}	—N/a	1h 42min	—N/a	3h 35min^{3}	2h 47min	3h 06min	3h 20min^{3}		—N/a	5h 31min	—N/a	4h 59min	—N/a	7h 35min
Innsbruck Hbf	—N/a	7h 15min	—N/a	9h 48min	—N/a	10h 13min	5h28min	—N/a		2h 09min	—N/a	4h 03min	—N/a	—N/a
München Hbf	7h 09min	3h 55min^{3}	—N/a	4h 32min	5h 28min	4h 44min	3h 09min	5h 31min	1h 56min		5h 34min	2h 12min	3h 56min	3h 32min^{6}
Paris Gare de l'Est	—N/a	8h 08min	—N/a	—N/a	—N/a	—N/a	3h 47min^{3}	—N/a	—N/a	5h 34min		3h 09min	—N/a	—N/a
Stuttgart Hbf	5h 03min	5h 04min	—N/a	2h 13min	3h 25min	2h 28min	1h 17min^{3}	4h 59min	6h 17min	2h 12min	3h 09min		—N/a	—N/a
Vienna/Wien Hbf	—N/a	7h 40min	—N/a	8h 50min	10h 06min	—N/a	6h 21min	—N/a	—N/a	—N/a	—N/a	—N/a		—N/a
Zürich HB	—N/a	8h 39min	—N/a	—N/a	—N/a	—N/a	3h 53min	7h 35min	—N/a	3h 32min^{6}	—N/a	—N/a	—N/a	
^{1} German category 1 stations and comparable international destinations of 250.000 passengers per day or more^{2} only direct connections shown; travel times as of the DB 2018 timetable^{3} ICE Sprinter^{4} Travel times as of NS 2026 timetable^{5} additional or alternative ICE stops for Berlin at: Berlin Südkreuz, Berlin-Gesundbrunnen, Berlin-Spandau and Berlin Ostbf for Cologne (Köln) at: Köln Messe/Deutz and Köln/Bonn Flughafen Fbf for Frankfurt at: Frankfurt (Main) Flughafen Fbf and Hamburg at: HH-Altona, HH Dammtor and HH-Harburg^{6} EuroCity-Express Service

== Accidents ==
There have been several accidents involving ICE trains. The Eschede disaster was the only accident with fatalities inside the train, but other accidents have resulted in major damage to the trainsets involved.

=== Eschede disaster ===
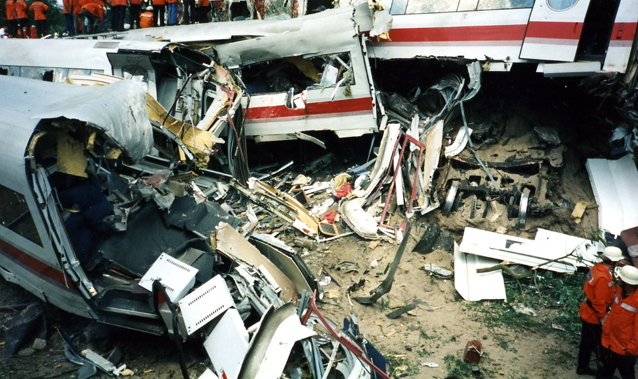
Eschede site – remains of ICE 884 "Wilhelm Conrad Röntgen"

The ICE accident near Eschede that happened on 3 June 1998 was a severe railway accident. Trainset 51, operating the ICE 884 Wilhelm Conrad Röntgen service from Munich to Hamburg, derailed at 200 km/h (124 mph), killing 101 people and injuring 88. It remains the world's worst high-speed rail disaster.

The cause of the accident was a wheel rim which broke and damaged the train six kilometres south of the accident site. The wheel rim penetrated the carriage floor and lifted the check rail off a set of points close to Eschede station. This guide rail also penetrated the floor of the car, becoming embedded in the vehicle and lifting the nearby wheels off the rails. One of the now-derailed wheels struck the points lever of the following set of points to change direction, and the rear cars of the trainset were diverted to a different track. They hit the pillars of a street overpass, which then collapsed onto the tracks. Only three cars and the front powerhead passed under the bridge, the rest of the 14-car train jack-knifed into the collapsed bridge.

=== Other accidents ===
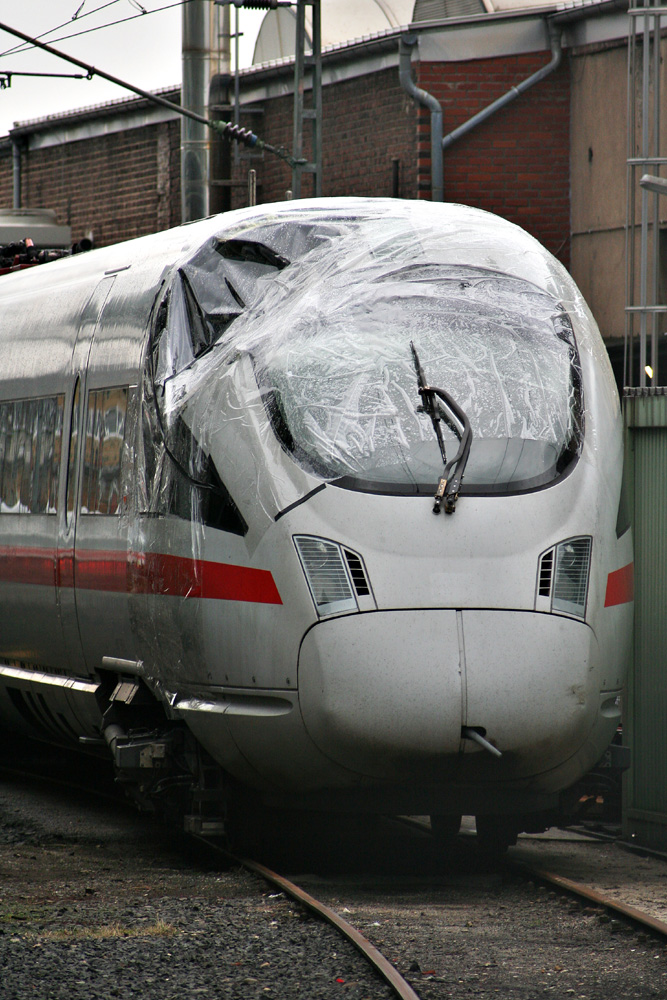
Damaged ICE T trainset 1192

On 27 September 2001, trainset 5509 fell off a work platform at the Hof maintenance facility and was written off.

On 22 November 2001, powerhead 401 020 caught fire. The train was stopped at the station in Offenbach am Main near Frankfurt a.M. No passengers were harmed, but the fire caused the powerhead to be written off.

On 6 January 2004, ICE TD trainset 1106 caught fire while it was parked at Leipzig. Two cars were written off, and the others are now used as spares.

On 1 April 2004, trainset 321 collided with a tractor that had fallen onto the track at a tunnel entrance near Istein, and was derailed. No-one was injured. Trainset 321 was temporarily taken apart, its cars being switched with cars from other ICE 3 trainsets.

Powerhead 401 553 suffered major damage in a collision with a car on the Mannheim–Frankfurt railway in April 2006.

On 28 April 2006, trainset 73 collided head-on with two BLS Re 465 locomotives at Thun in Switzerland. The driver of the Swiss locomotives was unfamiliar with the new layout of the station, which had been recently changed. He did not see a shunting signal ordering him to stop. The locomotives automatically engaged the emergency brakes when he passed the signal, but came to a stop on the same track as the approaching ICE. The ICE was travelling at a speed of 74 km/h. The emergency brake slowed the train to 56 km/h at the point of collision. 30 passengers and the driver of the ICE suffered minor injuries, the driver of the Swiss locomotives having jumped to safety. Both trains suffered major damage. The powerhead 401 573 had to be rebuilt using components from three damaged powerheads (401 573, 401 020 and 401 551).

On 1 March 2008, trainset 1192, travelling as ICE 23, collided with a tree which had fallen onto the track near Brühl after being blown down by Cyclone Emma. The driver suffered severe injuries. The trainset is back in service, its driving-car having been replaced with that from trainset 1106.

On 26 April 2008, trainset 11, travelling as ICE 885, collided with a herd of sheep on the Hanover-Würzburg high-speed rail line near Fulda. Both powerheads and ten of the 12 cars derailed. The train came to a stop 1300 metres into the Landrückentunnel. 19 of the 130 passengers suffered mostly minor injuries, four of them needing hospital treatment.

A cracked axle was blamed for a low-speed derailment of a third-generation ICE in Cologne in July 2008. The accident, in which no-one was hurt, caused DB to recall its newest ICEs as a safety measure. In October 2008, the company recalled its ICE-T trains after a further crack was found.

On 17 April 2010, ICE 105 Amsterdam - Basel lost a door while travelling at high speed near Montabaur. The door slammed into the side of ICE 612 on the adjacent track. Six people travelling on ICE 612 were injured.

On 17 August 2010, the ICE from Frankfurt to Paris hit a truck that had slid from an embankment on to the rail near Lambrecht. The first two carriages derailed and ten people were injured, one seriously.

On 11 January 2011, trainset 4654 partly derailed during a side-on collision with a freight train near Zevenaar in the Netherlands. There were no injuries.

On 2 May 2017, a trainset was derailed at Dortmund Hauptbahnhof. Two people were injured.

On 12 October 2018, two cars of a trainset caught fire while it was traveling from Cologne to Munich on the Cologne-Frankfurt line. Five people suffered minor injuries during the evacuation.

== Fare structure ==
An ICE train pulling into Köln Hauptbahnhof, December 2014 (video)

=== Germany ===
ICE trains are the highest category trains in the fare system of the Deutsche Bahn. Their fares depend on a multitude of factors including demand and how long in advance tickets are booked.

=== Austria ===
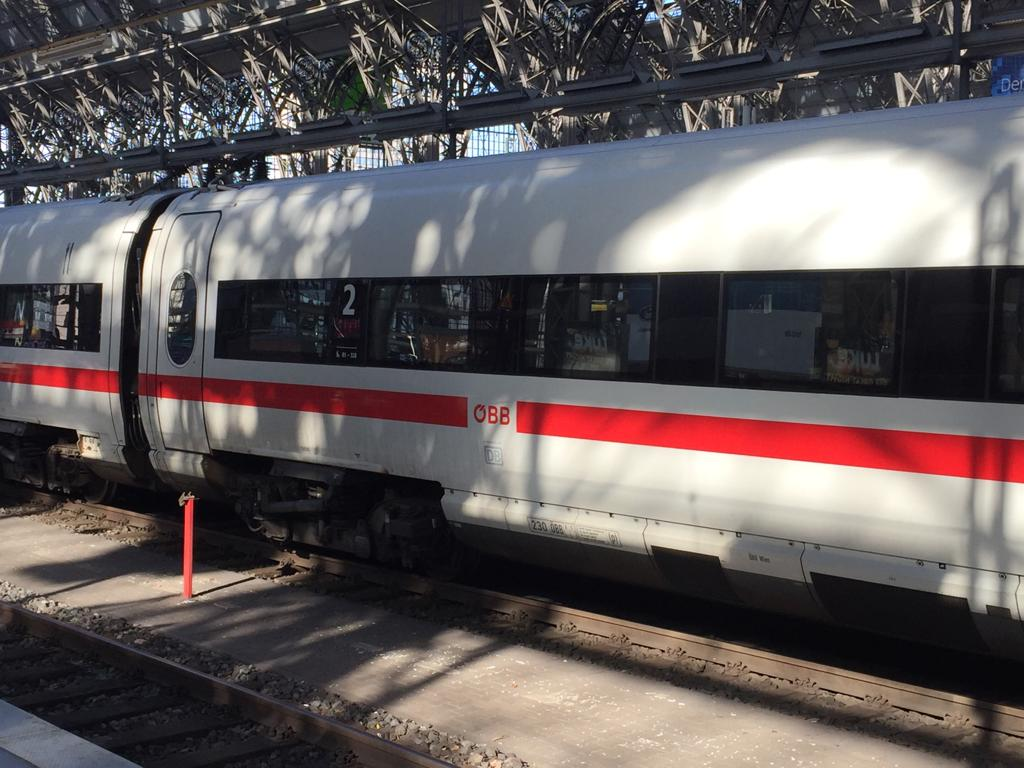
ICE of the ÖBB (Austrian Railways)

On the intra-Austrian lines (Vienna-Innsbruck-Bregenz, Vienna-Salzburg(-Munich), Vienna-Passau(-Hamburg) and Innsbruck-Kufstein(-Berlin)) no additional fees are charged.

=== Switzerland ===
Likewise, the trains running to and from Zürich, Interlaken and Chur, as well as those on the intra-Swiss ICE trains (see above) can be used without any surcharge.

=== Netherlands ===
On ICE trains between Amsterdam and Cologne, passengers travelling nationally within the Netherlands (between Amsterdam Centraal and Arnhem Centraal) can use the national OV-chipkaart scheme but have to purchase a supplement. Passengers travelling into/from Germany have to buy an international ticket.

=== France ===
On ICE trains between Paris Est and Frankfurt or Stuttgart, only the fare system from SNCF Voyageurs is used for national trips to Forbach and Strasbourg. Reservation is compulsory for trips to/from and within France.

== Scale models ==
Various ICE train scale models in several scales have been produced by Märklin, Fleischmann, Roco, Trix, Mehano, PIKO. and Lima.

== Possible future service to London ==
In January 2010, the European railway network was opened to a liberalisation intended to allow greater competition. Both Air France-KLM and Deutsche Bahn have indicated their desire to take advantage of the new laws to run new services via the Channel Tunnel and the High Speed 1 route that terminates at London St Pancras International.

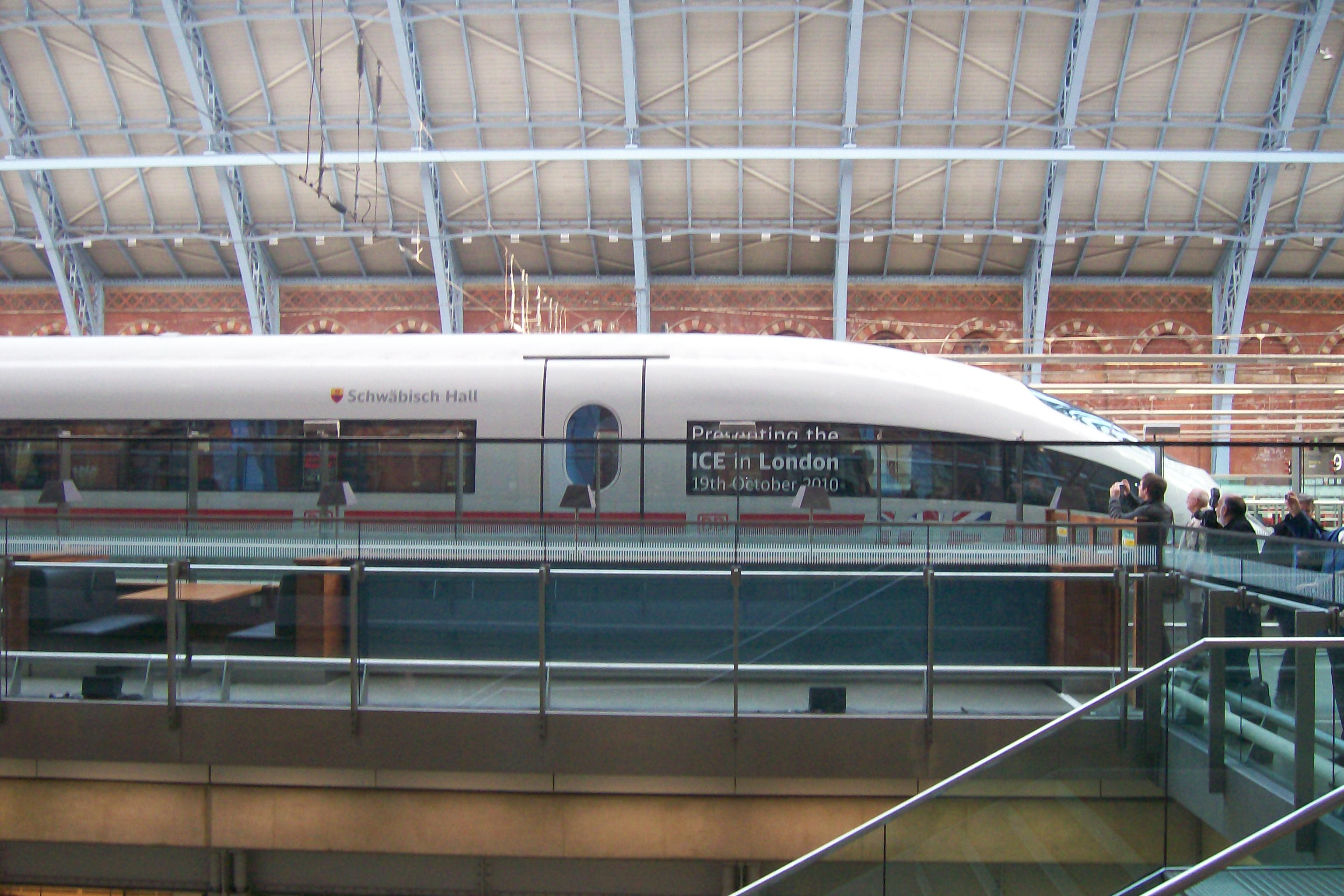
ICE at St Pancras with commemorative decals

A test run of an ICE train through the Channel Tunnel took place on 19 October 2010. Passenger-carrying ICE trains, however, will have to meet safety requirements in order to transit the Channel Tunnel. Although the requirement for splittable trains was lifted, concerns remain over the shorter length of ICE trainsets, (Note: ICE is too short to ensure sufficient proximity to tunnel emergency exits, but DB claims that a Tunnel safety exercise on 18 October 2010 had been "highly successful".) fire safety, (Note: The DB Class 406 ICE3M/F sets used for the demonstration run do not meet the specialized fire safety requirements for the carriage of passengers through the Channel Tunnel, but the later Siemens Velaro ICE-3D DB Class 407 sets, which also entered service with Eurostar as the e320, include the necessary additional fire-proofing.) and the ICE's distributed power arrangements. There have been suggestions that French interests have advocated stringent enforcement to delay a competitor on the route. Eurostar also chose Siemens Velaro-based rolling stock; there were concerns that Alstom (builders of the passenger trains that already use the Tunnel) and the French Government would take the matter to court. In October 2010, the French transport minister suggested that the European Railway Agency (based in France) should arbitrate. After safety rule changes which might permit the use of Siemens Velaro rolling stock, the French government dismissed their delegate to the Channel Tunnel Safety Authority, and brought in a replacement.

In March 2011, a European Rail Agency report authorized trains with distributed traction for use in the Channel Tunnel. This means that the ICE class 407 trains which DB intends to use for its London services will be able to run through the tunnel. In February 2014, however, Deutsche Bahn announced further difficulties with launching the route, and reports make it seem unlikely that service will start anytime this decade.

In June 2018, Deutsche Bahn announced that it was shelving plans to revive a potential London-Frankfurt ICE connection. The service would take around 5 hours and could rival airlines and become the first competitor for Eurostar. As of 2025 Eurostar has also in its plans to launch direct train services between London and Frankfurt with the same travel duration.

== Ridership ==
Ridership
Year	million riders	±% p.a.
1991	5.1	—
1992	10.2	+100.00%
1993	14.6	+43.14%
1994	21.3	+45.89%
1995	27.2	+27.70%
2000	41.6	+8.87%
2005	66.8	+9.94%
2010	77.8	+3.10%
2015	80	+0.56%
2018	94	+5.52%
2019	99.2	+5.53%

From its inception in July 1991 to 2006, ICE has transported roughly 550 million passengers, including 67 million in 2005. The cumulative sum of passengers is roughly 1.25 billion in 2015.

== Legacy ==
On 5 October 2006, the Deutsche Post AG released a series of stamps, among them a stamp picturing an ICE 3, at 55+25 euro cents.

In 2006, Lego modelled one of its train sets after the ICE. A Railworks add on is available for Train Simulator 2018 accurately reflecting the original 1991 version of the ICE on German tracks (Siegen to Hagen). There is also an addon utilising the Munich - Augsburg line using ICE 3 trainsets. The ICE 3 can also be used in Career scenarios on the Mannheim-Karlsruhe route (including the extension to Frankfurt), and Cologne-Düsseldorf. The ICE T, ICE 2, and ICE TD are also available for purchase as separate vehicles.

== See also ==
- List of Intercity-Express lines
- List of Intercity-Express railway stations
- High-speed rail in Europe
  - AVE
  - TGV
  - X 2000
  - YHT
- Rail transport in Europe
- Train categories in Europe
- Acela
