= Intercity Experimental =

German experimental high speed train

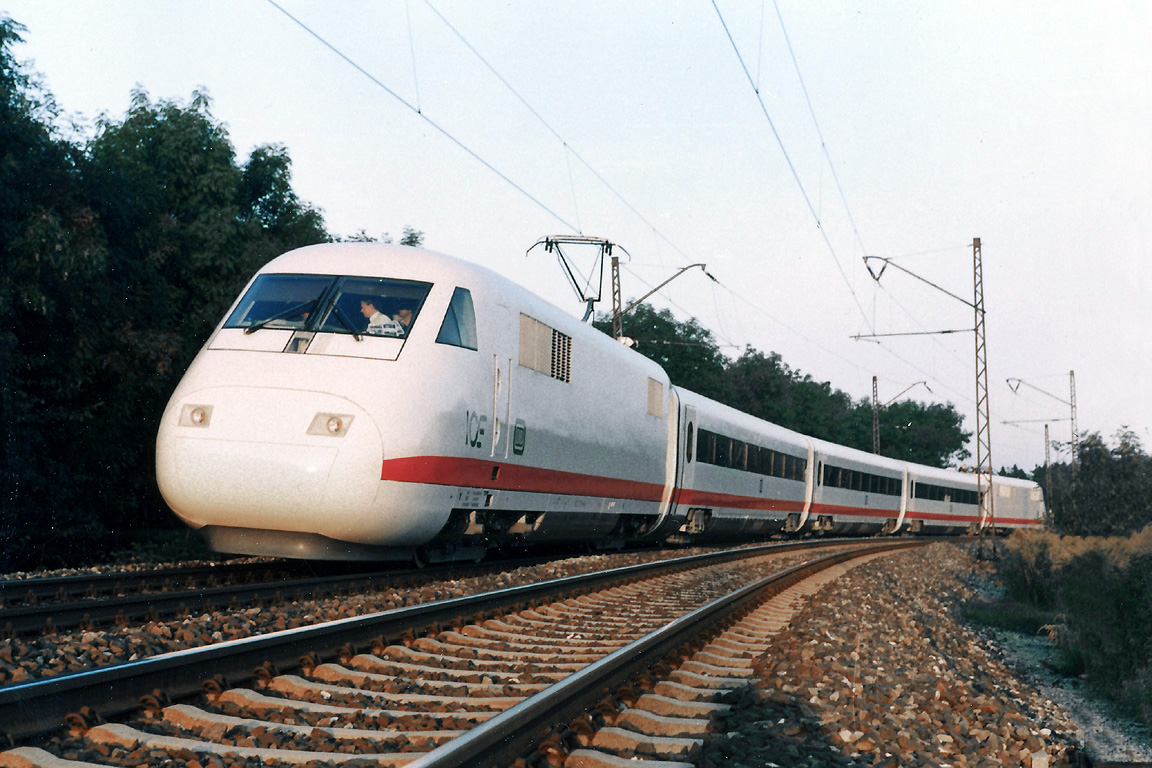
- 410 001 MKF train

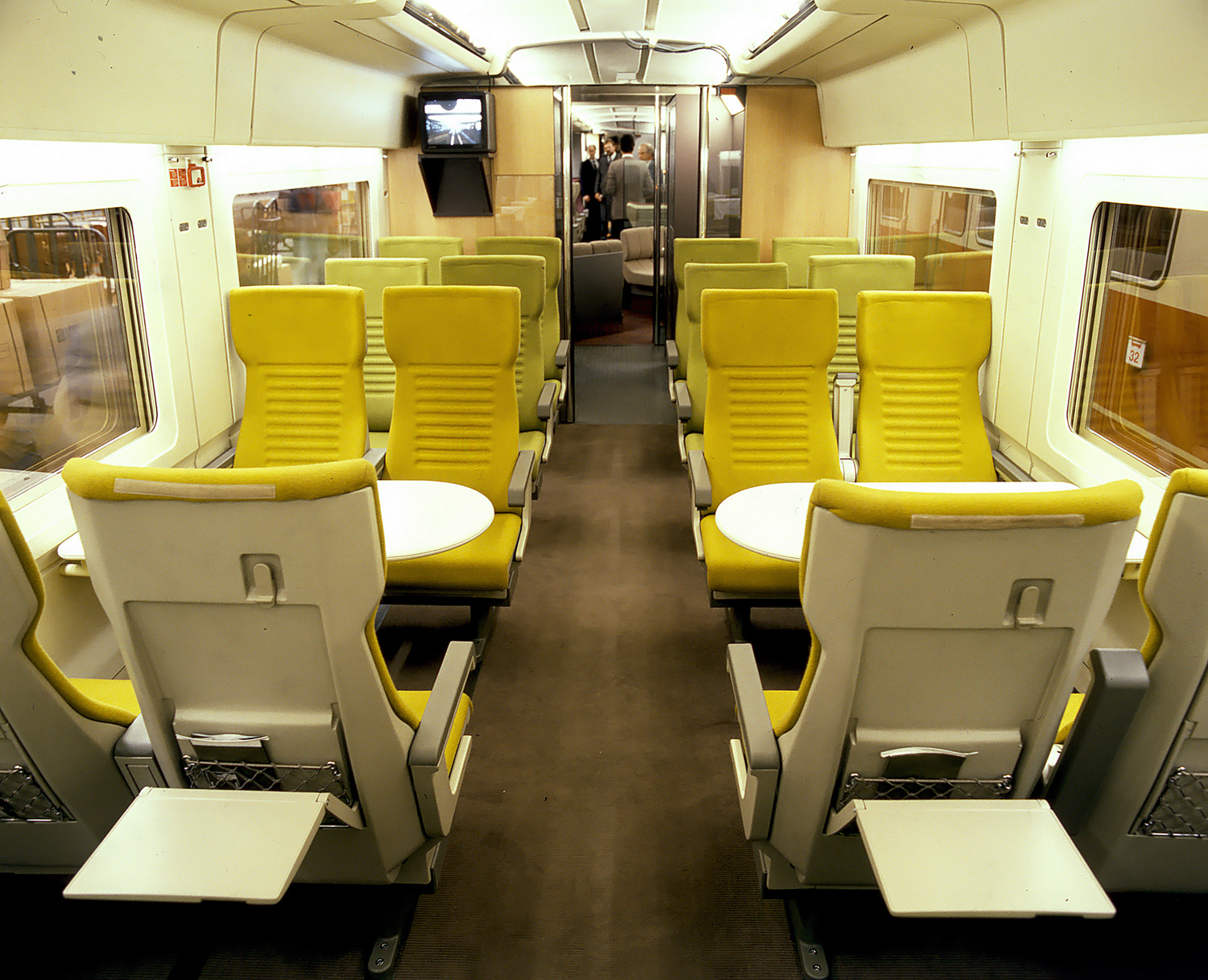
- Interiors in second class
- In service: 1985–1998
- Manufacturers: Siemens, Krauss-Maffei, Krupp, Thyssen-Henschel, AEG, Brown, Boveri & Cie
- Designers: Alexander Neumeister, N+P Industrial Design
- Capacity: 60 (first class), 27 (second class)
- Operator: Deutsche Bundesbahn

Specifications
- Train length: ca. 114 m (374 ft 0 in)
- Width: 3,070 mm (10 ft 1 in) (power car); 2,930 mm (9 ft 7 in) (coaches)
- Height: 3,820 mm (12 ft 6 in) (power car); 3,650 mm (12 ft 0 in) (coaches)
- Wheel diameter: 920 mm (36 in) (new); 870 mm (34 in) (used)
- Wheelbase: 1,150 mm (45 in)
- Maximum speed: 406.9 km/h (252.8 mph)
- Weight: 296 t (291 long tons; 326 short tons) (powerheads 77.7 t (76.5 long tons; 85.6 short tons) each)
- Power output: 8,400 kW (11,300 hp) (2x4,200 kW (5,600 hp))
- UIC classification: Bo'Bo'+2'2'+2'2'+2'2'+Bo'Bo'

The Intercity Experimental, later renamed ICE V, was an experimental train developed by the Deutsche Bundesbahn for research into high-speed rail in Germany. It is the predecessor of all Intercity Express trains of the Deutsche Bahn.

== Design ==
The trainset was built with two Class 410 power cars built jointly by Krupp, Krauss-Maffei and Thyssen-Henschel, and up to three Class 810 intermediate coaches, of which two were built by Messerschmitt-Bölkow-Blohm and one by Duewag and Linke-Hofmann-Busch. When one of the coaches was used for measurement purposes, the other two were used for demonstration of a modern high-speed train. The powercars weighed 78 tons each and had a maximum output of 3,640 kW. They were mostly based on the DB Class 120 locomotives developed earlier, but had been equipped with an aerodynamic outer hull and a corporate identity livery. In the summer of 1986, one of the coaches (810 001) was refurbished from a measurement coach to a demonstration coach.

After a derailment on 3 September 1986, one of the power cars was not available for service. For a period of 10 months, one of the coaches was temporarily refit with a driver's cab in order to avoid further stalling of project schedules of the experimental project.

== History ==
=== Background ===
The German Federal Ministry of Education and Research in 1968 commissioned a study on the technical and economic feasibility of high-speed rail transport in Germany. The results, published in 1971, showed a necessity for higher speeds in the German railways. In 1972, the ministry took the lead in developing new railway technologies. During the same time, a working group for "Rail/Wheel" was initiated in the Bundesbahn Central Offices in Minden. Initially, they concentrated on research regarding the Maglev project Transrapid that eventually led to the Emsland test facility.

The Bundesbahn was then more skeptical about the Maglev technology, and forced, from their side, more research into high-speed rail using conventional rail-wheel technologies. A 28 km (17 mi) test section of rail on the Hamm–Minden railway was (from 1973) already available for testing, and a specially modified Class 103 locomotive was able to reach speeds of up to 250 km/h (160 mph). During the test runs a lot of knowledge was gained about the effects of high-speed rail. These insights also impacted the service of the Intercity trains that were to reach up to 200 km/h (120 mph). The National Transport Plan (Bundesverkehrswegeplan) of 1973 laid the important foundations for the construction or upgrade of up to 2,000 km (1,200 mi) railway lines for them to be rated for speeds of 300 km/h (190 mph).

In the beginning of 1974, the industry, along with the Deutsche Bundesbahn set up a "Community Office" (Gemeinschaftsbüro) for the development of a 300 km/h (190 mph) train. More than 30 concept variations of a high-speed train were studied, particularly having the costs per person-kilometer in consideration. The selection was then narrowed down to 10 variations, and the initial results were presented in 1975. A test locomotive of 12 MW (16,000 hp) power and the capability to reach 400 km/h (250 mph) was also suggested to be built, but was not realised due to cost restrictions. A draft of a train capable of reaching 300 km/h (190 mph) for 200 to 600 passengers was put forth by the company Messerschmitt-Bölkow-Blohm in 1978, but was not realised as well.

In 1975, the Bundesbahn, the industry and research communities agreed on a three-step research strategy. Building on the research conducted in the first step, the second step should involve testing of the research. Under this step, a roller dynamometer test bench in the Schwabing neighbourhood of Munich was built, capable of reaching speeds of up to 500 km/h (310 mph). A planned national transport test facility in the second half of the 1970s did not, however, materialise.

The newly founded Forschungsgemeinschaft Rad/Schiene (Rail-wheel research community) from the industry, universities, and the railways took up works towards a conventional test train, this time with the perspective of user- and passenger-friendliness. On 19 December 1979, the group introduced the first prototype, called the Versuchsfahrzeug 1 (test train 1). By the middle of 1980, a three-part train capable of reaching 350 km/h (220 mph) was developed, and the name Versuchsfahrzeug 2 (test train 2) was used. This was to be tested in the then-under-construction railway test facility Rheine-Feren, between the towns of Rheine and Freren. After the dry tests of the test train 1 in the early 1980s, preparations for a new prototype began, now named as the Rad/Schiene-Versuchs- und -Demonstrationsfahrzeug (Rail-wheel test and demonstration power train) (R/S-VD). In August 1982, the Deutsche Bundesbahn decided to invest 12 Million Deutsche Mark (DM) in the R/S-VD project, and changed the name to IC Experimental (Intercity Experimental).

=== Development and production ===
As part of the studies supported by the Federal Ministry for Research, the Bundesbahn worked with several companies to prepare a concept for a prototype of a high-speed railway system. After analysis, a train with two powercars and many coaches was projected and planned for. This concept being the basis of the project, it was supported by the ministry through a publication on the Bundesanzeiger (federal register) on 10 February 1981. The central office of the Bundesbahn in Munich evaluated various offers and tenders for cooperation till September 1981. Although the Bundesbahn had previously voted to start the development of the project immediately, the project did not begin immediately since the ministry could not completely secure the support of the industry in that time. On 6 September 1981, the required financing was secured, and the requirements to start the project were met. That was also the same day when the name of the train was changed from R/S-VD to IC Experimental. The larger plan for the project was for the manufacturing of the train to be complete by 1985, so that it could be presented to the public on the 150th anniversary of the Bundesbahn.

Originally in 1982, a train with two powercars and six coaches was planned for, one of the coaches being a measurement coach and the other five being demonstration coaches with varying interiors, totally capable of holding up to 600 passengers. As early as November 1982, the number of planned coaches was reduced to two, on grounds of costs. In March 1983, the leadership of the Bundesbahn decided to allow the development of a third coach, in order to possibly offer more seating variations, particularly the second class.

Throughout the development process, the Bundesbahn worked together with the industry, supported by the ministry. The development of technical components necessary for the development of a high-speed rail system took nearly 12 years. Parallelly under the same ministerial support programme, the support for magnetic levitation technology also took place.

The development of the train that was finally put into service began in September 1983 under the leadership of the Bundesbahn in Munich. Manufacturing started by the end of 1983, with the mechanical part of the powercars being developed and constructed by Krupp, Henschel and Krauss-Maffei. The electrical parts were developed by Siemens, AEG and Brown, Boveri & Cie. Both the parts were assimilated and finished by Friedrich Krupp in Essen (powercar 410 001) and Thyssen-Henschel in Kassel (powercar 410 002). By October 1984, the assembly and finishing of the electrical parts were ready. In January 1985, the chassis was attached to the outer hull.

The Deutsche Bahn contracted the firm Messerschmitt-Bölkow-Blohm in 1984 for the development and manufacturing of the middle coaches. The demonstration coaches 810 001-8 and 810 002–6 as well as the measuring coach 810 003-4 were built by the firm Duewag in Krefeld-Uerdingen, and finished by the firm Linke-Hofmann-Busch in Salzgitter. They were then brought to Donauwörth for the begin of the electrical set up in 1984.

The cost of construction was split between the Federal Ministry for Research (61%), DB (17%) and the involved companies (22%).

The train was delivered in 1985 and was used mainly for testing purposes for the new Intercity Express trains and as a showcase train. It set the new land speed record for railed vehicles on May 1, 1988, at 406.9 km/h (252.8 mph), which remained unsurpassed until 1990.

The delivery of the ICE 1 powercars (now called Class 401), based on those of the ICE-V started in 1987. After that, the train was mainly used for material evaluation. The train was retired in 1998 and its powercars and cars were placed on exhibition at various sites. It was replaced by the ICE S.

=== Locations ===
Locations of preserved units of the train
Unit 001-1	Deutsches Museum Verkehrszentrum München	48.1326483°N 11.5420624°E
Unit 001-2	DB Systemtechnik Minden (private campus)	48.132663200°N 11.5415161905°E
