= ICE S =

German experimental high speed train

ICE-S
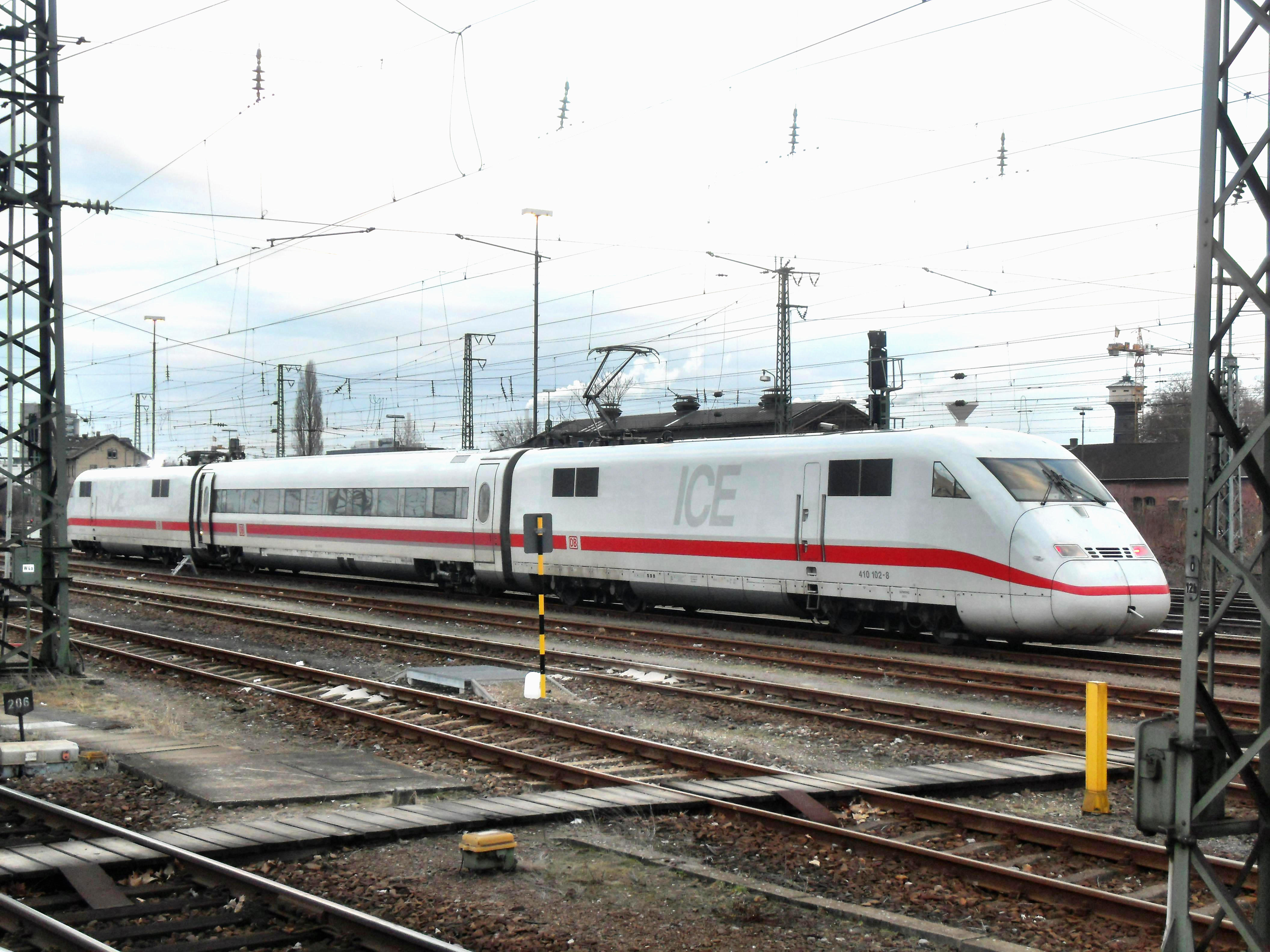
Type and origin
- Power type: electric
- Builder: Siemens, DWA, AEG, Adtranz
Specifications
- Configuration
  - UIC: original composition: Bo′Bov+Bo′Bo′+2′2′+Bo′Bo′+Bo′Bo′ current composition: Bo′Bo′+2′2v+Bo′Bo′
- Loco weight: 325 t (320 long tons; 358 short tons)
Performance figures
- Maximum speed: 330 km/h (205 mph)
- Power output: powerheads: 2×4,800 kW (6,400 hp) powered carriages: 2×2,000 kW (2,700 hp)
Career
- Delivered: 1996

ICE S is Deutsche Bahn's train for high-speed tests. The letter "S" abbreviates the German expression Schnellfahrt, which translates into high speed run. The train replaced the InterCityExperimental (ICE V).

== History ==
The train was originally used to test components during the development of the ICE 3 in the mid-1990s. The powerheads were taken from the ongoing production of the ICE 2 with only minor modifications. Two of the three original carriages had 500 kW (670 hp) traction motors on each axle, resulting in an impressive overall power output of 13,600 kW (18,200 hp). When testing was completed, both these powered carriages were retired.

After the ICE V was retired, the ICE S became the test and measurement vehicle for maintaining existing and approval runs on new high-speed lines. Three times a year, the train runs on each line with an array of sensors and cameras to determine the line's condition. During the acceptance tests of new high-speed lines, the ICE S is usually the first train to use the line at the design speed and beyond.

While testing bogies for DB and Japan Railways Group, the train achieved a speed of 393 km/h (244 mph) on 13 July 2001, which is the highest speed driven on German rails since the InterCityExperimental's land speed record campaign in 1988.

== Future ==
This train was originally built for testing the technical concepts of the ICE 3, and operated with three intermediate cars forming "half an ICE 3" (transformer car and two cars with traction motors). Now most operate with only one intermediate car for different testing purposes.

The train consists of two motor units (derived from the ICE 2) and three coaches with test equipment. The train, which has a power rating of 14,000 kW (19,000 hp) (2x 5,000 kW (6,700 hp) (motor units) + 2,000 kW (2,700 hp) (motor bogies of coaches)) at the moment, will be used to test new components for the forthcoming ICE 3. Although the coaches are designed for 330 km/h (205 mph), it is planned to attain a top speed of 440 km/h (275 mph) (which would be a new record for German trains). The main visible differences to normal ICE 2 trainsets are the special design and the three pantographs of the coaches.
