= Münden Tunnel =

German railway tunnel

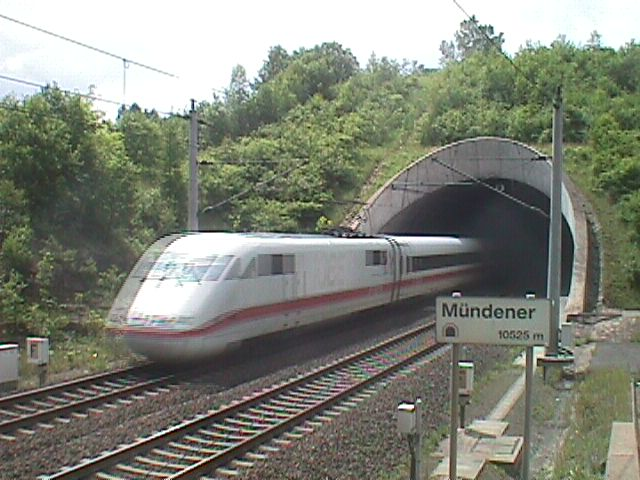
Northern portal, 1999

The Münden Tunnel (German: Mündener Tunnel) is a railway tunnel on the Hanover-Würzburg high-speed rail line in Germany. It is situated south of the town of Hann. Münden between Göttingen and Kassel. At a total length of 10,525 metres (6.540 mi), it is the second longest tunnel in Germany after the Landrücken Tunnel. The tunnel was built between 1983 and 1989. At the northern portal, which is located at 51°24′12″N 9°42′31″E, the trains cross the valley of the river Werra on the Werra Viaduct at Hedemünden, parallel to the A 7 autobahn. At the southern portal, (51°21′45″N 9°34′33″E) they cross the Ickelsbach valley, after which the Mühlenkopf Tunnel follows immediately.

== Tunnel description ==
The tunnel is a two-track concrete tunnel with a maximum permitted speed of 250 km/h. There is an emergency exit about halfway through the tunnel, at km 127 (51°23′18″N 9°37′50″E), which is accessible through a 15 metre deep staircase. The maximum depth of the tunnel is 175 metres.

Originally, two separate tunnels were planned, the Mündener Staatsforst tunnel (5,580 m) and the Lutterberg tunnel (4,440 m), to be joined by a bridge over the Wandersteinbach. Due to ecological considerations, however, the line was lowered by 30 metres and the Wandersteinbach was crossed by means of a tunnel as well. The tunnel breakthrough was on October 6, 1988. On May 29, 1991 the tunnel was officially opened, along with the Hanover-Fulda part of the high-speed rail line. The cost of construction was about DM 200 million (€102 million).
