= Hanover–Würzburg high-speed railway =

High-speed railway in Germany

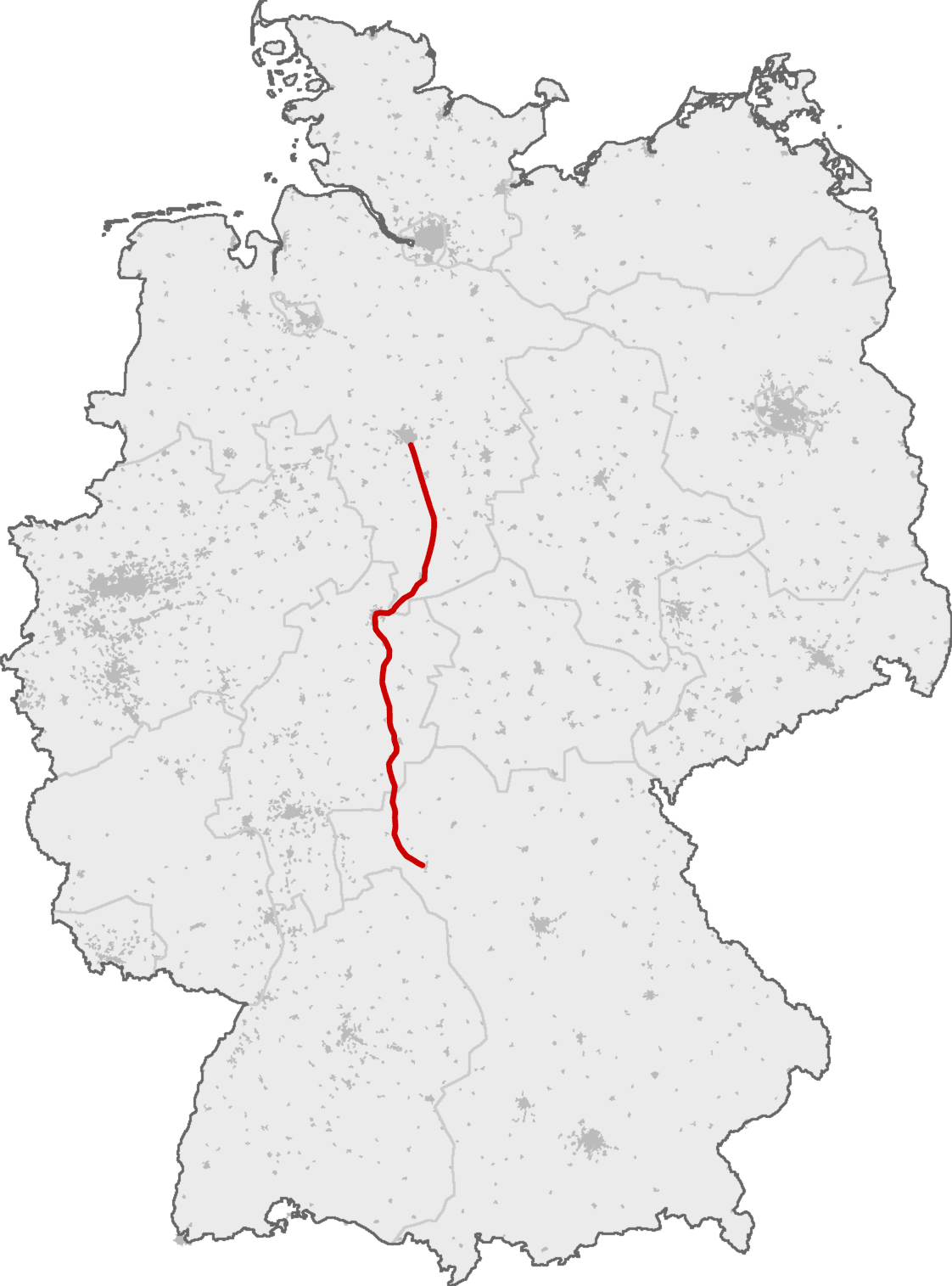

Overview
- Native name: Schnellfahrstrecke Hannover–Würzburg
- Line number: 1733

Service
- Route number: 351; 900.1

Technical
- Line length: 327 km (203 mi)
- Track gauge: 1,435 mm (4 ft 8 1/2 in) standard gauge
- Minimum radius: 5,100 m (16,700 ft)
- Electrification: 15 kV/16.7 Hz AC overhead catenary
- Operating speed: Service: 250 km/h (155 mph); Maximum (if delay): 280 km/h (175 mph)
- Signalling: PZB, LZB
- Maximum incline: 1.25%

The Hanover–Würzburg high-speed railway is a double-track, electrified high-speed railway between Hanover and Würzburg in Germany, 327 kilometres (203 mi) in length. The line, built between 1973 and 1991, was the longest contiguous new project constructed by Deutsche Bundesbahn. The total costs were almost DM 11.9 billion (around €6.1 billion; 1980/90s prices).

The line is part of the core network of the Trans-European Transport Networks. It is scheduled to be used by around 110 long-distance trains daily at up to 280 kilometres per hour (170 mph) during the day and by an average of 26 freight trains at night with a total of 37,460 gross tonnes (83 million pounds), running at up to 160 kilometres per hour (99 mph). In 2020, the number of passengers on the line was estimated to be 15.5 million. To date, it is the longest greenfield line for high-speed traffic in Germany.

== Route ==
Before the line was built, long-distance trains ran between Hanover and Würzburg via Alfeld, Kreiensen and Northeim to Göttingen (Hanoverian Southern Railway), continuing via Eichenberg, Eschwege West, Bebra, Bad Hersfeld, Fulda and Gemünden am Main to Würzburg (old North–South railway).

The upper edge of the rail is at heights between 50 m above sea level and 386 m above sea level. The new line is 35 kilometres shorter than the pre-existing lines between Hanover and Würzburg. It runs parallel to existing routes over a length of 51 kilometres.

At the time of the division of Germany, 70 percent of the line ran through the border zone.

Autobahn 7 also runs through all the major stops along the line. The federal highway 27 is also largely parallel, although this does not run through Hanover and Kassel.

=== Hanover–Göttingen section ===
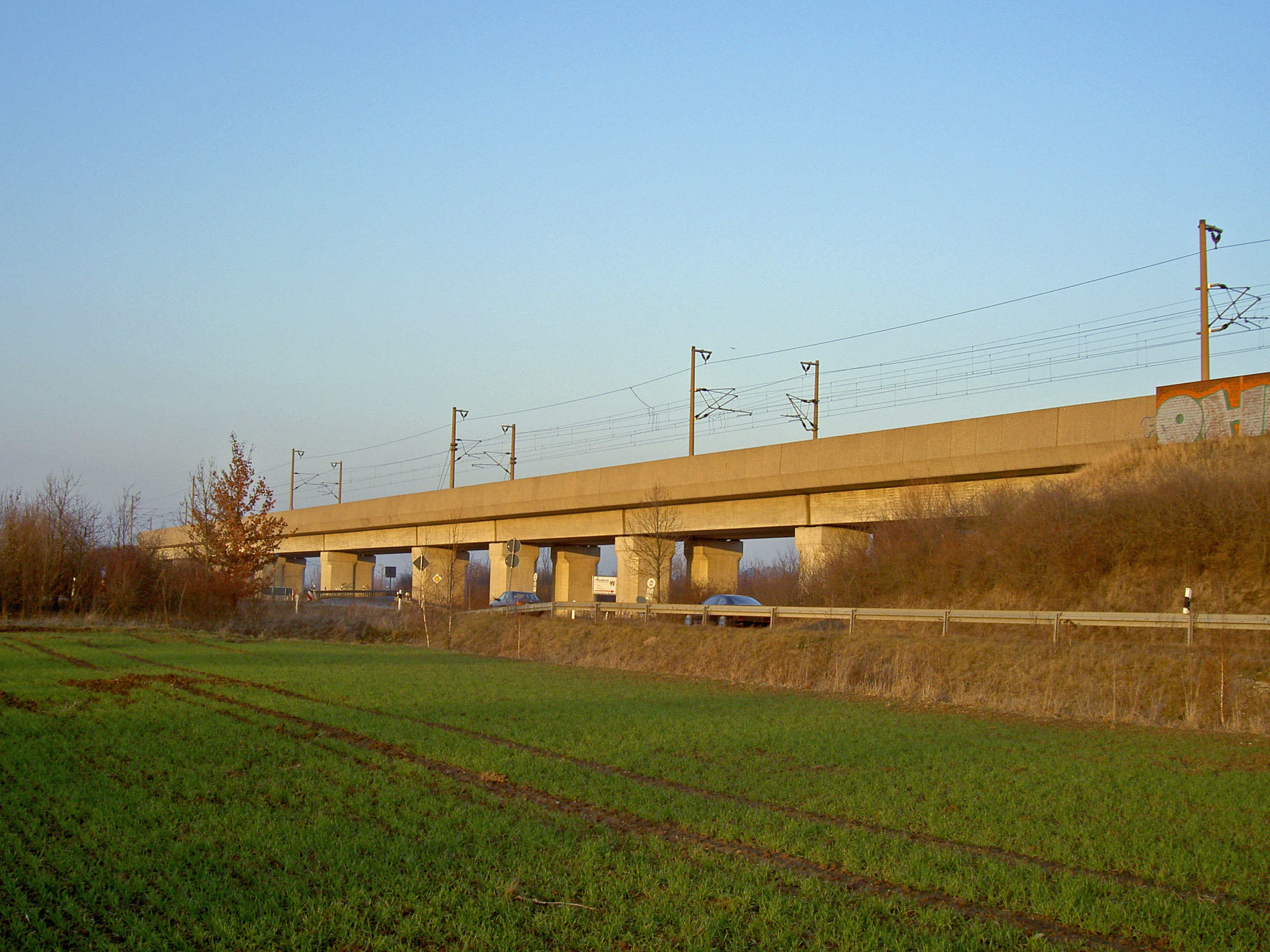
Bridge at Barnten

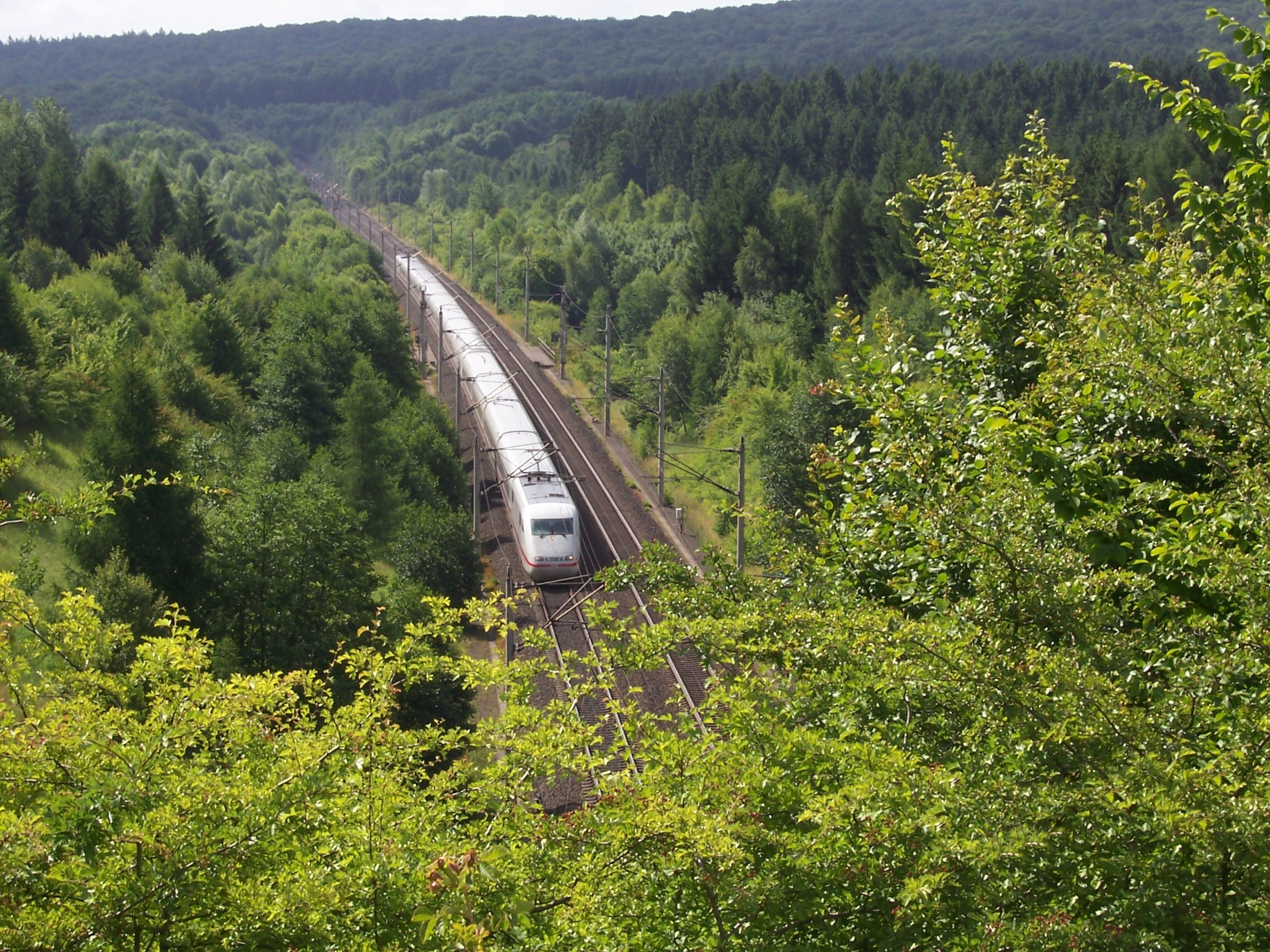
An ICE set in the Hildesheim Forest, between Eichenberg tunnel and Escherberg tunnel, running north

The 327.4 kilometre-long new line begins at kilometre 0.0 in Hannover Hauptbahnhof. Running in a southerly direction, it follows the existing north-south line in Hanover's urban area via the Hannover Messe/Laatzen station, which is also served by long-distance trains (primarily during trade fairs), at km 8 towards Rethen. The two high-speed tracks run between Hanover Bismarckstraße and the junction in the middle with the tracks of the old line. The high-speed line leaves the parallel section at a grade-separated crossing and swings away from the old line in a south-westerly direction. It then crosses eleven bridges between Rethen and Barnten with a total length of 1.1 kilometres and runs on embankments up to eight metres high with a total length of 6.9 kilometres through the flood plains of the Leine and the Innerste. The Hildesheim loop, a single-track connecting curve, which is used by trains to and from the Hanover–Berlin high-speed railway via Wolfsburg, Braunschweig and Hildesheim, branches off at Sorsum (km 29).

With the entry into the Escherberg tunnel and two subsequent tunnels, the line leaves the North German Plain and passes through the Hildesheim Forest. Between Sibbesse and Bad Gandersheim, the line follows the course of a valley without major engineering structures, before after another six tunnels and five viaducts it reached the Leinegraben and the high-speed line at Edesheim swings back to run parallel with the north-south line. There, at km 77, it is possible to switch to and from the old line in both directions. Northeim is bypassed to the west, at Nörten-Hardenberg station at km 90 it is also possible to change tracks with the old line. Göttingen station is reached at kilometre 99.

=== Göttingen–Kassel section ===
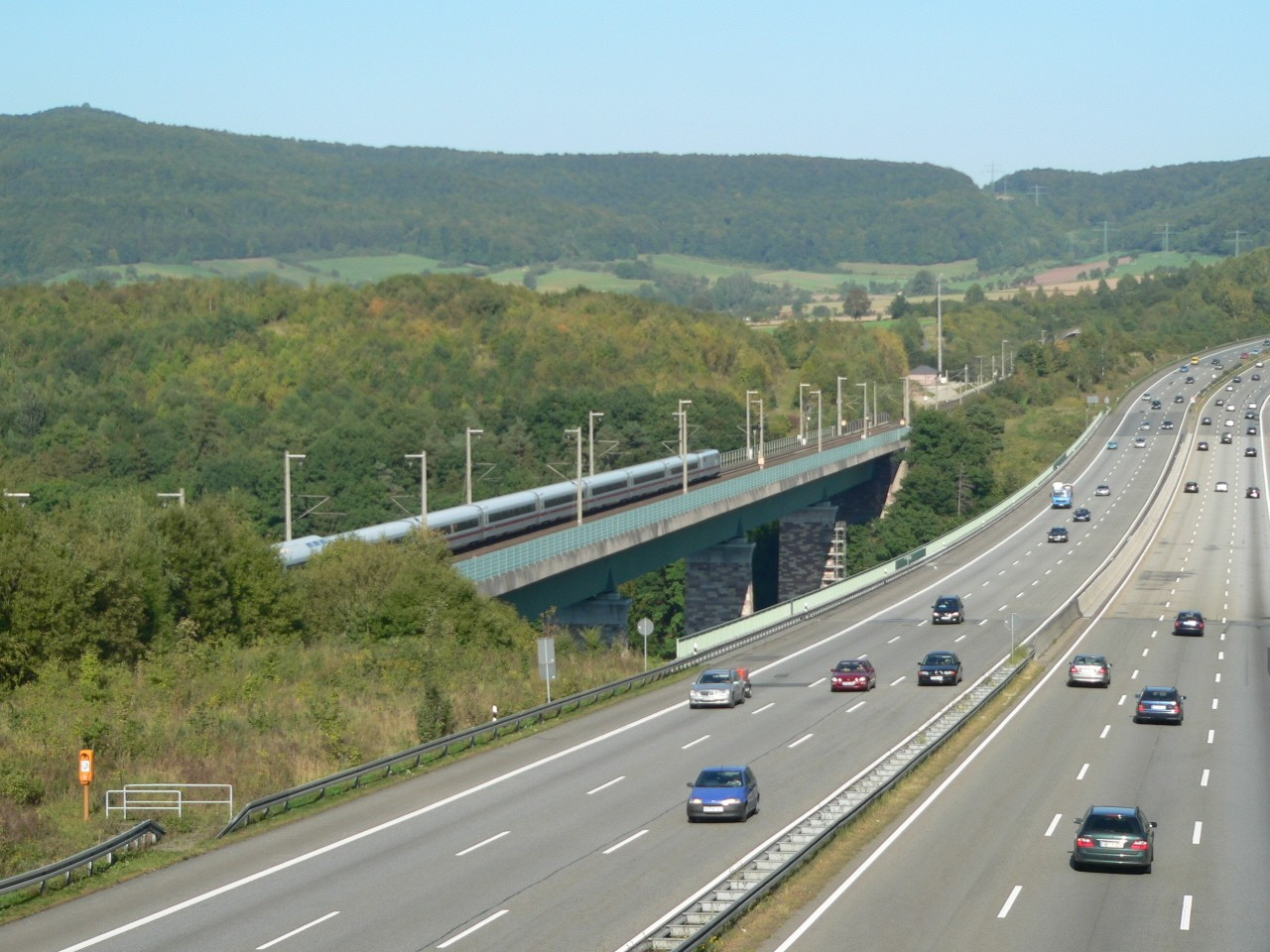
In contrast to the later new lines, the route is hardly in traffic route bundling to motorways. An exception is the Werra Viaduct, parallel to the A 7 bridge.

In the section between the stations of Göttingen and Kassel-Wilhelmshöhe, the line follows a fairly straight line. Almost 21 kilometres of the 44-kilometre section runs in tunnels, including the 10,525-metre-long Münden Tunnel (km 121), the second longest tunnel in Germany.

In the vicinity of the Fulda Viaduct in Kragenhof (km 133), the high-speed line begins to run generally parallel with the north-south line, which it will follow for nine kilometres to the southern outskirts of Kassel. The line passes the western edge of the Kassel marshalling yard and reaches Kassel-Wilhelmshöhe station at route kilometre 144. The station, which was newly built as part of the high-speed line, bypasses the Kassel Hauptbahnhof terminus. In the Kassel area, the line runs for around 15 kilometres next to existing lines.

The highest costs per kilometre were incurred during the construction phase for the sparsely populated but topographically very complex section between Göttingen and the state border north of Kassel. In this section, the high-speed line runs past towns and villages at a distance of about 700 to 1000 metres, and a large part of the line is in tunnels anyway, in which the up to 400-metre-high elevations between Göttingen and Kassel are crossed. Exceptions are the Grone and Groß Ellershausen districts of Göttingen, for which noise barriers had to be built.

=== Kassel–Fulda section ===
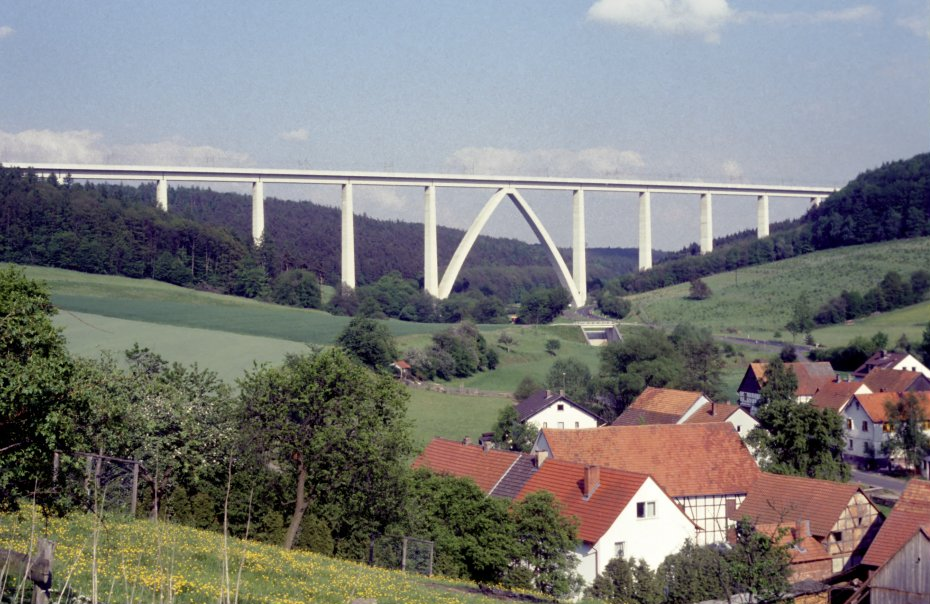
The Rombach viaduct, the second highest railway bridge in Germany

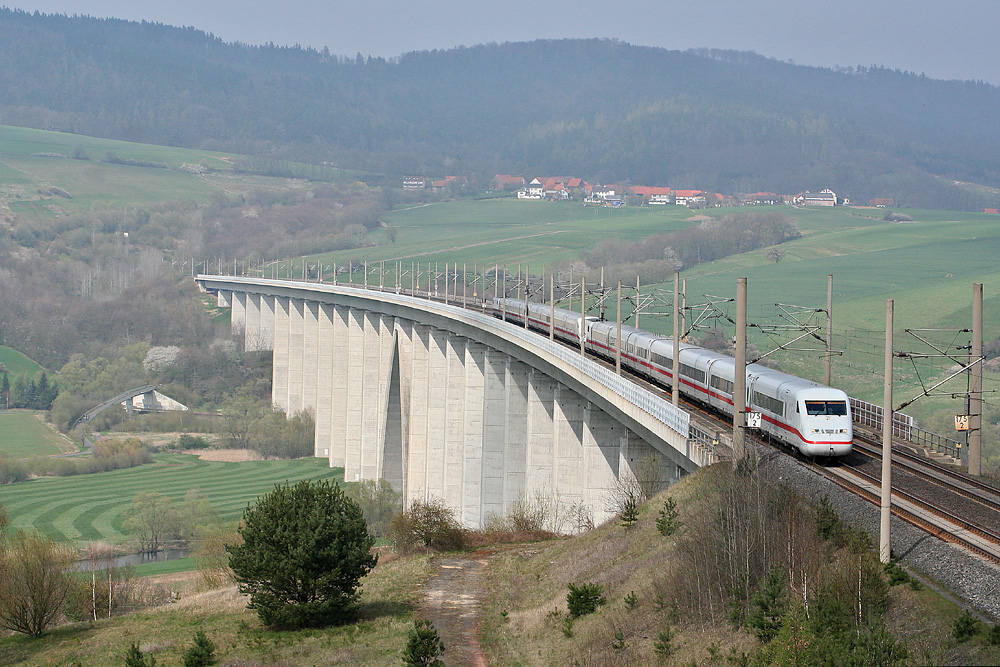
An ICE 2 set on the Fulda viaduct at Morschen

The line then runs on the 89.96 km-long section between Kassel-Wilhelmshöhe station and Fulda station, of which 47.79 kilometres run in 25 tunnels.

The route roughly follows the course of the Fulda, which is crossed three times. In the Bebra and Bad Hersfeld area, the line runs well to the west of the Fulda, some of it close to the A 7. Since the Fulda valley is too winding and narrowly built-up for a high-speed line and the side valleys largely run perpendicular to it, numerous structures are required on this section. Around two-thirds of the approximately 80-kilometre-long new section runs over 18 viaducts. The outstanding structures include the Fulda Viaduct at Solms (km 206), the longest bridge on the line at around 1600 metres, and the Rombach Viaduct (km 218), the second highest railway bridge in Germany at around 95 metres. After the 7,345 metre-long Dietershan tunnel, Fulda station (km 234) is reached.

Apart from the Fulda and Kassel junction areas, the new line runs almost entirely in uninhabited terrain in this section. The distance from settlements is usually at least 400 metres.

=== Fulda–Würzburg section ===
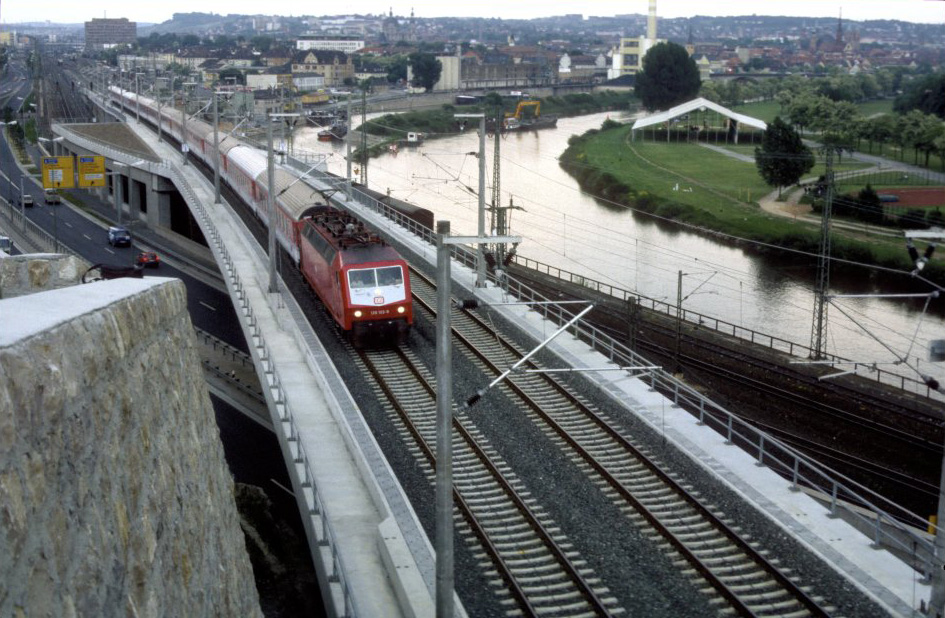
An Intercity on the ramp that runs from Würzburg Hauptbahnhof (in the background) to the high-speed line (May 1988)

South of Fulda station, the new line follows the Frankfurt–Göttingen railway for around four kilometres to Bronnzell, where the Frankfurt–Göttingen railway stops running parallel and turns in a south-westerly direction towards Frankfurt am Main. From this line, the Flieden–Gemünden railway branches off at Flieden to Gemünden and Würzburg. A series of shorter tunnels is followed by the 10,779 metre-long Landrücken Tunnel (km 251), the longest tunnel in Germany. At the north portal of the tunnel, the new line reaches 386 m above sea level its highest point. After the line descends to the Main Viaduct in Gemünden, it ascends further south. At the Burgsinn depot (km 283) there is the option of connecting from the Flieden–Gemünden railway, which runs to Gemünden and from there via the Würzburg–Aschaffenburg railway to Würzburg, onto the new line directly to Würzburg and vice versa.

The Nantenbach Curve coming from the Würzburg–Aschaffenburg railway merges into the high-speed line in Rohrbach operations station (km 302).

After the Main Viaduct at Veitshöchheim (km 321), the line runs through two more tunnels, turns to the left in the last one and merges via a ramp into Würzburg Hauptbahnhof (km 327) at a grade separated junction.

== History ==
The general route between Hanover and the Main valley resulted from the wish to eliminate existing bottlenecks on the heavily used north-south route.

In 1970, an average of 142 trains per working day and direction ran on the section between Fulda and Flieden (1967: 123). With an average load of 150 to 159 trains between Hanover and Flieden, 43 percent of all regular freight trains were delayed by more than 30 minutes at the end of the section. In June 1973, 367 trains ran between Northeim and Nörten-Hardenberg (near Göttingen) on weekdays, with only 288 being able to operate smoothly. At the end of the 1970s, 160 trains per day ran between Hanover and Würzburg, according to the then Deutsche Bundesbahn, 40 more than "technically and economically justifiable". The section between Gemünden am Main and Würzburg was particularly badly affected. With up to 380 trains per day, an operating performance that had not previously been thought possible was achieved. Despite modern signalling systems, operational quality restrictions (particularly in terms of punctuality) were unavoidable. A forecast made in the early 1980s for 1990 estimated that 249 trains per day would run in each direction between Hanover and Göttingen and 250 between Fulda and Flieden.

The first preliminary drafts of a new line for the development program for the Deutsche Bundesbahn network were developed between 1968 and 1970. On 4 August 1969, the head office of Deutsche Bundesbahn issued a first planning order for a new line that would run from Nordstemmen (south of Hanover) via Fulda to Würzburg. With the approval of the DB network development program in 1970, the executive board (Vorstand) and board of directors of the then national railway made it possible to commission planning for new and upgraded lines. The line between Hanover and Gemünden am Main was one of the most urgent projects. In 1971, a contract for the planning of the line was issued.

The line was to run parallel with the existing line between Hanover and Nordstemmen for around 30 kilometres, then leave the Leine valley, head southwest over the Vogler (around 260 metres high) into the Holzminden area, then follow the Weser to the east and cross it at Würgassen (a district of Beverungen). Hümme (near Hofgeismar) would be bypassed to the east at about kilometre 100 before reaching a through station at Kassel-Wilhelmshöhe at about kilometre 135. North of Kassel, the line would be linked to the planned Dortmund–Kassel supplementary line. The line would pass over the Knüll mountains at a height of 420 metres with links to the existing line west of Fulda. Overcoming the Hessian ridge was planned as the third major climb on the line, in order to then reach Gemünden at an altitude of 150 meters via the Sinn valley.

The selected route, which would have been suitable for passenger and freight traffic, emerged as the most favourable solution from the requirement to connect both Kassel and the line to Frankfurt south of Fulda. The 275-kilometre route was intended to reduce the length of the rail link between Hanover and Gemünden by around 60 kilometres. The travel time in long-distance passenger transport would fall from around 160 minutes to 90 minutes. Construction was scheduled to begin in 1973 and be completed in 1980. Earlier completion of individual sections was considered. It was estimated to cost DM 4.2 billion (around €2.1 billion).

The routing of the supplementary line, which was intended for both passenger trains and freight trains weighing up to 1,000 t, was at a design speed of 300 km/h, although lower maximum speeds would also be selected if necessary due to particularly high expenditures on short sections. The planned minimum radii were 7,000 metres (5,000 metres in exceptional cases) with a cant of up to 75 millimetres. The gradients should not exceed the 1.25% specified in the railway regulations (Eisenbahn-Bau- und Betriebsordnung—EBO), although technical advances (automatic couplings, electric traction, etc.) should also allow gradients that exceed this, up to 2.5%. The loading gauge would initially be 4.40 metres wide and 5.40 metres high (without pantograph and overhead line) in order to meet the diverse requirements of rail freight transport. Due to a lack of experience with trains traveling at speeds of more than 200 km/h, a track spacing of 5.00 metres, in tunnels an increased spacing of 6.00 metres was considered as well as two separate single-track tunnels. The distance between the depots was set at around 20 kilometres and the establishment of transfer points was examined.

Gemünden station was to be upgraded as part of the line. Between Gemünden and Würzburg, the existing line, which was largely passable at 160 km/h, was to be used. A new line to Würzburg was not planned at the time, despite the planned supplementary line between Aschaffenburg and Würzburg. The line would have been 40 kilometres shorter than the existing lines between Hanover and Gemünden.

In 1971, a planning order for preliminary planning was given to the transport management centre (Zentrale Transportleitung, ZTP) and the federal railway divisions involved (Hanover, Kassel, Frankfurt and Nuremberg) for a line that was to supplement the existing north-south line in terms of quantity and quality. Kassel would also be connected. Considerations to upgrading the existing north-south route between Hanover and Göttingen to four tracks proved to be unfeasible. The line was in mid-1971 along with the Cologne–Groß-Gerau supplementary line one of two routes that have undergone in-depth route planning. Since the necessary topographical maps on a scale of 1:5,000 were largely missing, they were produced using aerial photography.

In the course of the corridor investigations commissioned on 15 June 1971, the costs of projects for different modes of transport in three selected corridors were compared with the benefits up to December 1974 for the first time. In the corridor between Hanover and Gemünden (with a continuation to Würzburg), the two supplementary routes, Hanover–Würzburg and Aschaffenburg–Würzburg were compared to the development of the proposed Autobahn 100 (a northern extension of the.

In 1973, project officers were appointed to the divisions. Links to the existing north-south route in Kassel and Fulda were already planned in the planning contract; the order made no further specifications. A new line between Hanover and the Würzburg area via Kassel was included as a project in the 1973 Federal Transport Plan (Bundesverkehrswegeplan). In December 1974, the Federal Minister of Transport instructed Deutsche Bundesbahn to build the line between Hanover and Würzburg. The ZTP Mainz developed a large-scale rough route, which largely adapted to the topographical conditions and would keep as large a distance as possible to settlement areas.

When planning the route, the focus was on accelerating and increasing the capacity of the growing freight traffic. In particular, freight trains would be enabled to jump overnight from the northern German ports to the industrial centres in southern Germany. Passenger trains on the Intercity network were to run on the line at speeds of up to 200 km/h, alternating with other passenger and freight trains.

The early design parameters for the route, initially referred to as the "high-speed railway", emerged from the high-performance high-speed railway study (HSB). These provided for a top speed of 300 km/h with a minimum curve radius of 7000 metres. In addition to a maximum longitudinal gradient specified in the EBO of 1.25%, a maximum of 1.8% was considered for short sections (initial considerations assumed 2.5%). In early considerations, the loading gauge would be particularly large compared to the existing network. Wagons that were 4.30 metres wide with roofs 5.60 metres above the top of the rails would be able to transport trucks in closed railway wagons in piggyback traffic to relieve the roads of heavy traffic at high speeds. A three-track line was also considered to be able to handle reliable traffic on two tracks during construction work and other operational disruptions. The first traffic volume forecasts in 1971 and 1972 initially suggested an at least partially three-track line.

The oil crisis of 1973 and a recession in 1974/1975 led to more cautious forecasts in the mid-1970s, which allowed a double-track line throughout. Economic considerations also led to a reduction in the initial speed to 250 km/h. If a purely passenger line had been realised, about 20 percent of the construction costs would have been saved, according to DB.

The distance between the tracks would have been 5.40 meters for this loading gauge, the usable tunnel cross-sectional area above the top edge of the rails should be 103 square metres.

In 1975, these plans were discarded after investigations had shown that the additional costs of around ten percent for a clearance gauge were not offset by sufficiently large additional yields from piggyback transport. Instead, the expanded standard clearance profile was used as a basis for further planning of the route now known as the "new construction line". As network planning progressed, the planned Hanover–Gemünden and Aschaffenburg–Würzburg routes were combined to form the new Hanover–Würzburg route in the same year.

The main reason for the extension to Würzburg was capacity considerations—between Gemünden and Würzburg, the existing two-track line accommodated traffic to and from Fulda as well as traffic to and from Frankfurt am Main. On 13 July 1977, the board of directors of Deutsche Bundesbahn decided to build the new line between Hanover and Würzburg. The route was included in the Coordinated Investment Program for Federal Transport Routes in 1977.

The commissioning of the first two new high-speed lines in Germany was initially planned for 1985. As a result of the unexpectedly long planning process, it was postponed until 1993 in the early 1980s. In May 1982, the newly created Federal Railway Board (Bundesbahnvorstand) decided in July 1982 to continue building the lines and bring the commissioning forward to 1991.

On 28 May 1984, the board of directors of Deutsche Bundesbahn approved the high-speed railway project, which envisaged using the line for high-speed traffic at speeds of up to 250 km/h as soon as it went into operation. The necessary changes to the route planning were minor, mainly because the Re 250 overhead line had already been tested and was intended for installation.

=== Option selection ===
Due to its position as an urban area and transport node, the city of Kassel was a fixed point of the route. The specific route was finally developed in a multi-stage process. In the section between Hanover and Kassel, for example, numerous options were examined in a corridor about 50 kilometres wide. With the new line, Kassel was to be connected to the intercity network for the first time.

In the autumn of 1971, a route from Hanover via the Weser Uplands from Holzminden/Höxter and Kassel to Gemünden, designated Option I, was considered. In the course of the spatial planning procedure initiated in 1972 for the Hanover–Elze section (near Hildesheim), the supreme state planning authority of the state of Lower Saxony asked the Deutsche Bundesbahn in 1972 not only to consider a route via Holzminden, but also a route through the zone border area via Northeim and Göttingen. A match with the state planning goals was only established for the section between Hanover and Rethen. Option II, which was then developed, separated from Option I at Elze and ran west of the Leine valley via Nörten-Hardenberg to Göttingen and from there via Dransfeld to Kassel.

When construction work began in 1973 on the first section between Hanover Hauptbahnhof and Rethen (12 kilometres), further discussions arose. A large number of potential routes resulted in a solution known as Option III, which corresponds to the current route and runs via Bad Gandersheim and Northeim to Göttingen and from there in a south-easterly direction via Hannoversch Münden to Kassel. The decisive factor for this option was the wish to build the line from Rethen to Göttingen by the shortest possible route and to connect Hildesheim as well if possible.

In a business comparison between options I and III, option I was preferred. The additional traffic volume of a connection to Göttingen (II/III) could not compensate for the estimated additional investment of DM 500 million for the route, which is 20 kilometres longer than option I. The state of Lower Saxony and the Göttingen Interessengemeinschaft Trasse ("Trasse Interest Group") countered with their own studies and expert opinions on economic arguments for the connection of Göttingen. The Lower Saxony state government emphasised in a state planning statement of 1975 that from a state political point of view only one route via Göttingen was justifiable. Taking into account new planning parameters (250 km/h instead of 300 km/h speed, standard instead of large structural gauge), the economic difference was finally reduced to DM 300 million. In 1976, the discussion was concluded with the approval of the Federal Minister of Transport for the route via Göttingen. A study commissioned by the state of Lower Saxony had compared the options via Göttingen and Holzminden and found that the Göttingen option had consistently higher benefits.

In October 1974, Deutsche Bundesbahn decided to route the line via Gemünden am Main to Würzburg.

In the Fulda area, a western bypass of the city was originally planned, which was to be connected to the new line by means of links to the existing line at Maberzell and Kerzell. This option had already been discarded in the mid-1970s in favour of several variants of a route via Fulda station. In 1978 it was decided to run the new line parallel to the existing line via Fulda station for a length of 13 kilometres. The discussion about connecting Fulda to the line took a total of about seven years.

At the end of 1976, it was accepted that the new line in the Kassel area would be linked with the existing network at Fuldatal-Ihringshausen. This established the route between Hanover and Kassel. In Kassel, after long discussions, the decision was made around 1980 to route the line via a new Kassel-Wilhelmshöhe station. A route below the city with an underground through station under the existing Kassel Hauptbahnhof (main station), a terminal station, was rejected, as were two other options.

In a memorandum on the new Hanover–Würzburg line in 1983, BUND of Hesse proposed an alternative concept. The Main-Weser Railway would be upgraded and the new Kassel–Fulda section would not be built.

=== Planning ===
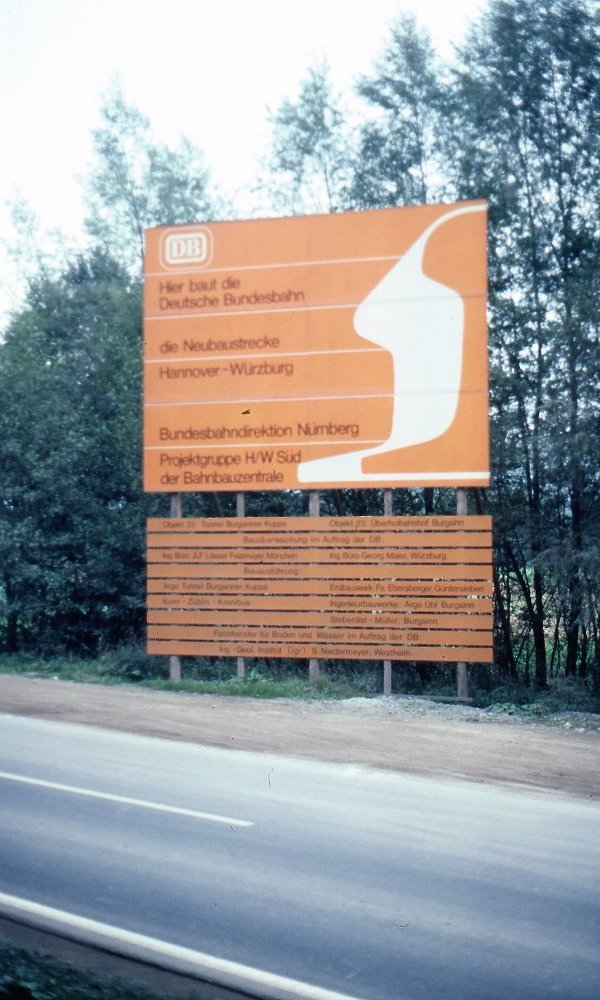
A construction panel on the new line in the 1980s. In 1974, the colour pastel orange (RAL 2003) and the "half rail" were introduced as a sign for the new and upgraded lines of the Deutsche Bundesbahn.

The first section between Hanover and Rethen (12 kilometres) was approved on 16 July 1973 by the Federal Minister of Transport (under Section 14, Paragraph 3c of the Federal Railways Act). The approved costs amounted to DM 226 million (1973 prices). This section was considered undisputed between DB, the federal government and the state of Lower Saxony, while the extension to the south was controversial.

In June 1978, Federal Cabinet decided to continue the new line. The Federal Transport Minister then approved the construction of the Rethen–Kassel and Burgsinn–Würzburg sections on 21 July 1978. Approval for the Kassel–Burgsinn section followed on 26 August 1980. The approved costs amounted to DM 4,750 million (1975 price levels) for Rethen–Kassel and a total of DM 5,060 million (1979 prices) for Kassel–Burgsinn and Burgsinn–Würzburg.

The line was divided into nine sections for the spatial planning process. From 1972, a total of 13 (another source: 11) spatial planning procedures were carried out. In most cases, sections were selected that could also be used independently for operational purposes. After the route between Hanover and Kassel was fixed at the end of 1976, the spatial planning procedure was initiated in several parts of this section in 1977. In 1977, the regional planning procedure for the Edesheim–Göttingen section was completed, and in April 1979, state planning approval for the Göttingen–state border section (north of Kassel) was issued. In January 1980, the 64 kilometre Rethen–Edesheim section followed. The last large-scale regional planning procedure for the 36 kilometre section between Gemünden and Würzburg ended after five and a half years on 20 May 1981 with a positive state planning assessment. The spatial planning procedures took between one and six years to complete.

After completion of the regional planning procedure, the planning approval procedure began. The route was divided into 88 planning approval sections. For this purpose, preliminary draft plans on a scale of 1:5000 were first drawn up, which were finally specified for the approval planning on a scale of 1:1000. In May 1981, 75 of the 314 kilometres of route between Rethen and Würzburg were approved, in late summer 1982 113 kilometres. Particular difficulties arose from the construction of new railway power lines. In order to limit the effects of the new line on many farms that had to be crossed, countless land consolidations were necessary. In the absence of applicable federal law, noise protection along the route was based on agreements with the federal states concerned.

On 26 August 1980, 90 percent of the route was determined in the course of regional planning and the Federal Ministry of Transport gave approval for the last section of the new line between Kassel-Wilhelmshöhe and Burgsinn (near Würzburg). Towards the end of 1980, the first construction work on the southern section was put out to tender.

While the first of 15 new planning approval sections in the northern section was determined in 1984, the last planning approval decision for the southern section was issued for the area of the Main Viaduct at Veitshöchheim on 12 December 1984. In 1985, 267 kilometres were approved. In October 1986, construction rights were finally granted for the entire route.

Construction of the line was controlled from the construction centre founded in April 1976, which reported directly to the board of directors of Deutsche Bundesbahn. Three project groups for the construction of the 327-kilometre new line based in Hanover, Frankfurt am Main and Nuremberg were assigned to the centre in October 1978. The middle section, coordinated from Frankfurt, comprised 111 kilometres, 28 tunnels (49 kilometres) and 22 larger viaducts and stretched from the Hessian-Lower Saxony state border on the east bank of the Fulda near Ihringshausen and ended five kilometres south of Fulda. The southern section, including 24 kilometres in Hesse, belonged to Project Group South (Nuremberg).

Countless discussions were held in the course of public relations work. By 1977, 25 citizens' groups had formed against the new line. In 1979, more than 40 such groups were counted. In the section between Kassel and Fulda alone, a total of 24 citizens' initiatives had been formed against the line by 1981. The spatial planning procedure had already been significantly delayed by the commitment of the groups. In negotiations with those affected, tunnels were extended, among other things, and municipal construction measures were financed from DB funds. Objections from residents led to significant cost increases within a few years. In the mid-1970s, for example, every fourth kilometre was still planned to be in a tunnel, but the proportion that was eventually realised was more than a third. The route length planned in 1979, at 327 kilometres, corresponded to that which was later realised. In the 1980s, resistance largely subsided. As late as 1983, the working group of rapid-transit rail opponents and the environmental association tried to prevent the construction of the section between Kassel and Fulda. The district of Hersfeld-Rotenburg petitioned the state administrative court for a connection between Bebra and the new line, for which the Rettet den Bahnhof Bebra ("Save Bebra station") citizens' initiative campaigned. A total of 10,700 objections were raised against the route and administrative disputes were filed in 360 cases.

The construction phase was preceded by an extensive exploration program. In the 111 kilometre central section alone, 1,200 bore holes with a total length of 45 kilometres were drilled and 200 excavations were carried out.

In the 1980 Federal Transport Routes Plan, the line was one of three new railway construction projects, stage I, which were to be completed by 1990. Investments of DM 2.3 billion were part of Stage II of the transport route plan, which was to be implemented after 1990. The planned costs in 1980 were DM 10.49 billion (1980 prices). The planned capacity was estimated in 1984 to be 120 trains per day and direction.

=== Design parameters ===
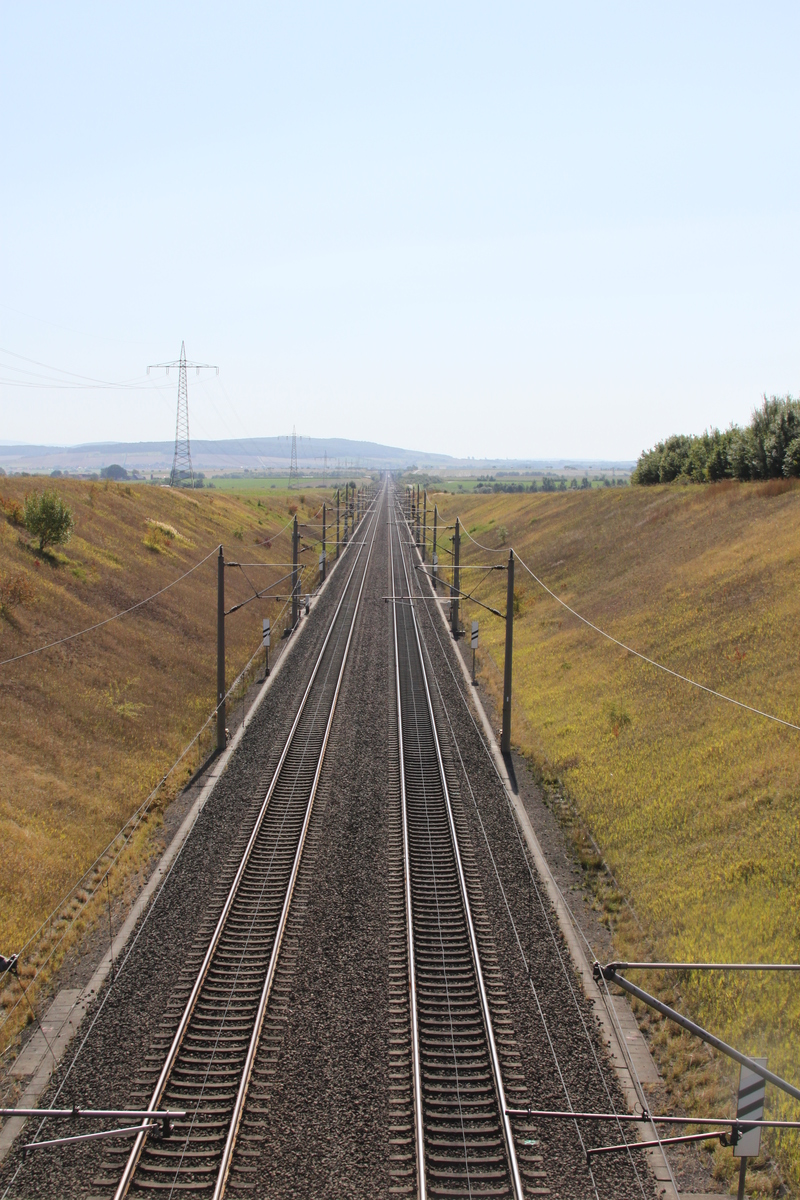
South of the Hildesheim Forest, the line runs straight for several kilometres

The new line was designed for mixed traffic of fast long-distance passenger and freight trains. This made comparatively large curve radii and comparatively small gradients necessary.

As a rule, the largest permitted curve radius is 7000 metres, the minimum radius permitted in special cases is 5100 metres. These values resulted from the initially planned design speed (250 km/h) and the initially planned minimum speed of freight trains (80 km/h). The standard superelevation is 65 millimetres, the maximum superelevation—to limit excessive wear—90 millimetres (according to other sources 80 millimetres). The maximum cant deficiency is 60 millimetres. The maximum gradient of 1.25 percent resulted from the requirement to be able to start up again after a stop on such gradients, even with heavy freight trains. As late as the mid-1970s, plans were still in place to initially only allow speeds of up to 200 km/h on the route in a first stage of development and to leave open a later upgrade for up to 300 km/h. The design speed ultimately adopted was 300 km/h with a cant deficiency of 130 millimetres at 250 km/h. The maximum speed of the ICEs was initially limited to 250 km/h.

The line was originally designed for the mixed traffic of 80 km/h fast goods trains and 250 km/h fast passenger trains. This resulted in the minimum radius of 5100 m with a cant of 65 mm with a cant deficiency of 80 mm for passenger trains and a cant excess of 50 mm for freight trains. During the high-speed transport project, the calculation speed for freight trains was increased to 120 km/h. The larger minimum radius that was desirable for this speed could not be implemented due to the progress of construction, so the superelevation was increased to 90 mm instead.

These generous routing parameters made a particularly large number of engineering structures necessary. 121 kilometres of the 327-kilometre route run through 61 tunnels and 30 kilometres over 294 bridges (including 43 viaducts). The highest bridge at 95 metres is the Rombach viaduct near Schlitz, the longest at 1628 meters is the Fulda viaduct at Solms. The Landrücken Tunnel (10,779 metres) and the Münden Tunnel (10,525 meters) are the longest tunnels in Germany. Almost a quarter of the 456 kilometres of tunnels in the Deutsche Bahn network is on the line. Around 83 kilometres run in cuttings and 77 kilometres on embankments. Only 17 kilometres (5%) are at ground level. The line occupies an area of 937 ha (2,320 acres).

In 1981, the planned total length of tunnels was 110 kilometres; embankments, 81 kilometres; cuttings, 99 kilometres; and bridges, 41 kilometres.

For the planned mixed operation of passenger and freight trains and for maintenance, crossovers were set up at intervals of five to seven kilometres and a total of eleven depots at intervals of around 20 kilometres.

The track centre distance of 4.70 metres resulted from the requirement to be able to transport extra-wide shipments in freight traffic. About 4.20 metres would have been sufficient for pure passenger transport operations.

=== Construction ===
On 10 August 1973, the construction of a first, twelve-kilometre section of the Hanover–Gemünden supplementary line began with the symbolic first ramming blow by Federal Transport Minister Lauritz Lauritzen near Laatzen. According to Lauritzen, this was the first start of construction of such a long-distance line since 15 May 1876, when construction began on the Hanover–Bebra–Frankfurt line.

A construction period of five years was expected for the entire line (as of 1977). The opening was to take place in 1985. Instead of the originally planned 160 kilometres, only 12 kilometres were completed in 1979 due to numerous delays.

After planning approval was given for about 20 kilometres of the new line in the southern section (Fulda–Würzburg) in the second half of the year and a positive conclusion to the pending Gemünden–Würzburg spatial planning process, the first construction contracts were tendered and awarded. The first structure in the southern section was the Sinn Viaduct at Schaippach with construction starting in October 1980, the large-scale construction work was officially initiated on 22 May 1981 with the opening of the one-off mountain tunnel near Gemünden. The Sinnberg Tunnel was opened on 25 February 1981 as the first tunnel on the line.

In the middle section, construction work began on the Nordendweg crossing in Kassel on September 29 of the same year (the official start of construction in the Hessian section took place in November 1981 with the laying of the foundation stone for this crossing by Minister-President Holger Börner). Due to objections conveyed in citizens' initiatives and lawsuits, extensive construction work in the northern section between Hanover and Göttingen did not begin until March 1983. With the start of the boring of the Münden and Mühlenkopf tunnels on 37 October 1983, construction work on the section between Kassel and Göttingen was officially initiated. On 31 May 1983, with the construction of the Steinberg-Bornhecke tunnel, a total of twelve tunnels of the first two new lines were under construction. In the same year, tunnel construction work began in the middle section.

The first mast of the new railway power lines was erected in February 1983 near Nörten-Hardenberg. By the end of 1983, DM 2.32 billion (around €1.14 billion) had been spent on the new line.

In October 1984, construction work was underway on almost three quarters of the line.

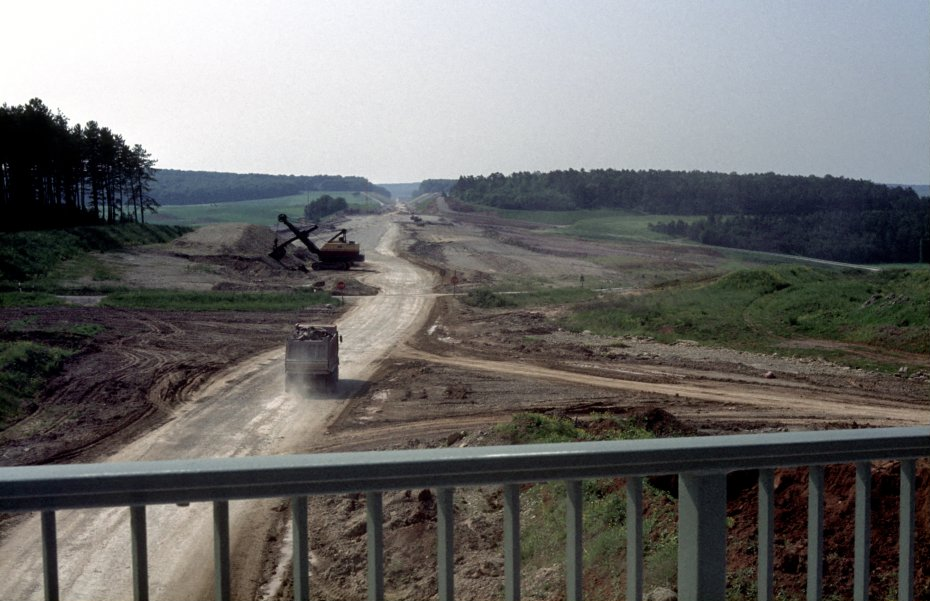
Earthworks at the future Rohrbach depot (June 1985)

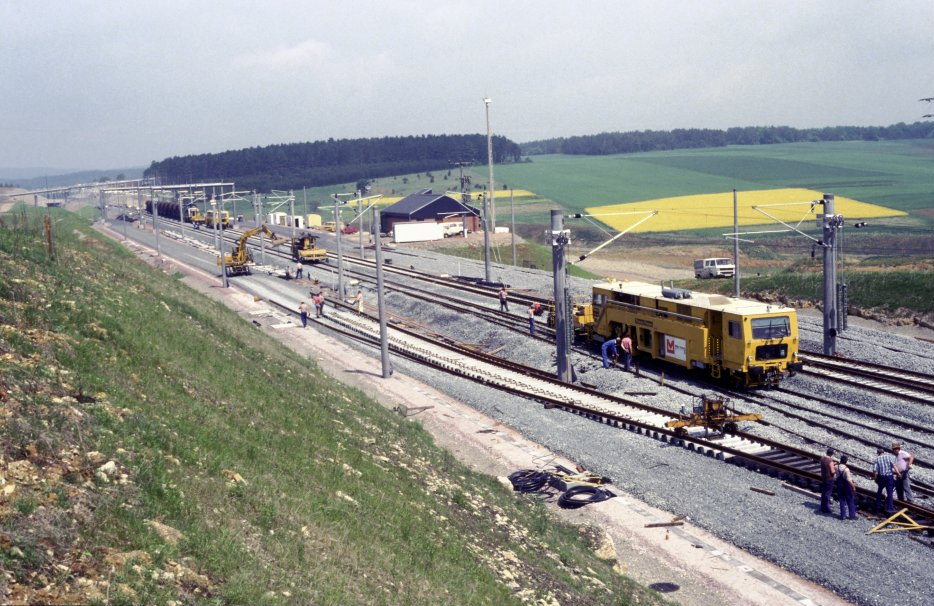
Track construction work at Rohrbach depot in May 1986

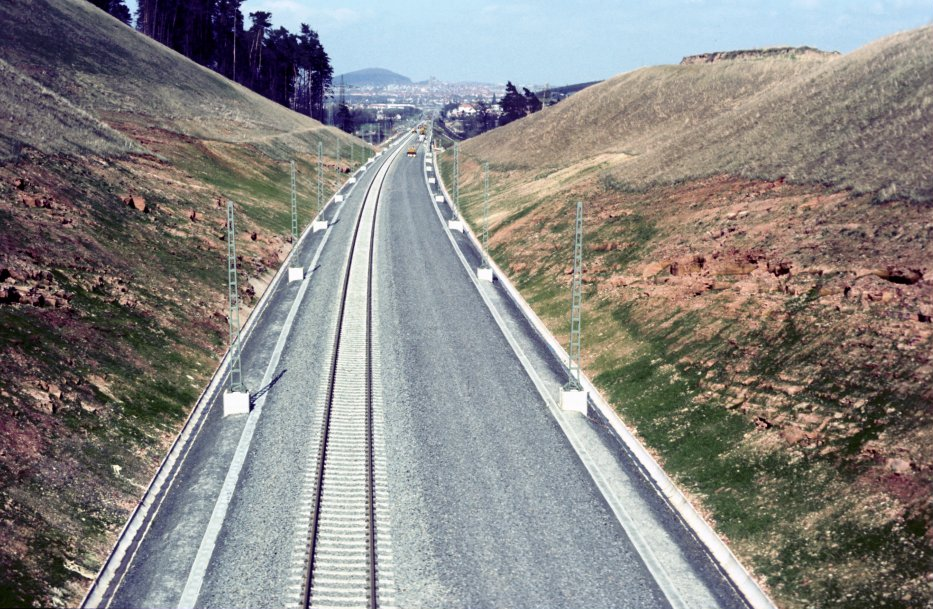
Construction work south of Fulda (May 1987)

After 184 days of construction, the Einmalberg tunnel near Gemünden am Main was the first tunnel to be broken through on 4 February 1982. The shell of the longest German railway tunnel, the Landrücken Tunnel, was completed in 1986. Seven workers had died during the tunnel construction work by the autumn of 1984. During the mid-1980s, only isolated construction work was going on in the northern section,< by January 1986 tenders for all construction work on the southern section had been awarded and 45 kilometres of infrastructure had been completed. On 4 November 1987, track construction began northbound from Fulda, initially to the Langenschwarz overtaking loop, 19 kilometres away.

In 1988 the last three tunnels of the line were cut through with the Helleberg, Münden and Rengershäusen tunnels. By the end of the year, half of the tracks between Fulda and Kassel had been laid, and the Kragenhof, Wälsebach and Mülmisch viaducts were completed during the year.

On 3 October 1989, the gap between Hanover and Göttingen was closed. On October 6, the Münden Tunnel was the last of the 61 tunnels to be broken through. On 2 November 1989, the last rail was installed on the Göttingen–Kassel section (in the Münden tunnel), and by mid-November 1989 all tracks in the Kassel–Fulda section were in place. This was followed by remaining work, for example the installation of overhead line and load testing of bridges.

The southern feeder line from Fürth to Würzburg was upgraded from two to three tracks in the section from Würzburg to Rottendorf by the summer of 1984 due to the expected increase in traffic over a length of eight kilometres. With the topping-out ceremony for the canopy at Kassel-Wilhelmshöhe station on 18 January 1990, the infrastructure of the entire line was completed.

The area required was 615 ha (1,520 acres) in the 111 km (69 mi) middle section alone, of which 305 ha (750 acres) were permanently used by the railway, the rest temporarily. While 98 ha (240 acres) were used purely for the railway line, 517 ha (1,280 acres) were used for replanting. In addition, in this section, 16 million m^{3} (570 million cu ft) of excess mass that could not be used for embankments was dumped in about 30 landfills, occupying another 220 ha (540 acres).

=== Commissionings ===
==== Hanover–Rethen (1979) ====
As early as May 12, 1979, after six years of construction, the 12.762 km (7.930 mi) section between Hanover Bismarckstraße station and Rethen was put into operation. In this section, 48.3 km (30.0 mi) of rails, 111 switches, 22 railway bridges and two flyover structures were built. In addition, nine level crossings were removed and the new Laatzen station and a new signal box were built in Rethen. The total cost of this first section, for which 70 thousand m^{3} (2.5 million cu ft) of concrete and 8,900 tons of steel had been used, was DM 233 million (about €119 million in 1979 prices).

==== Burgsinn–Hohe Wart (1986) ====
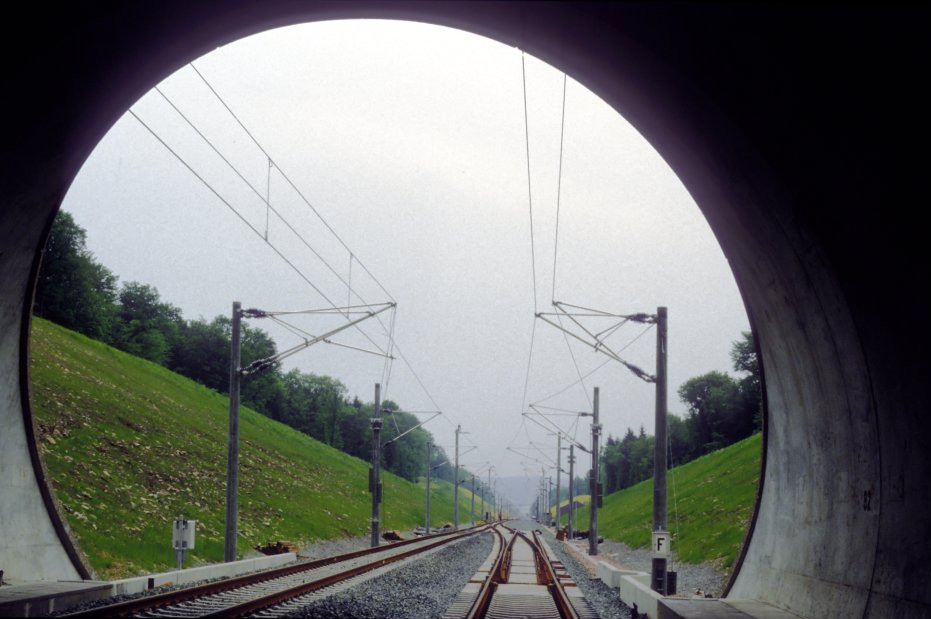
The south portal of the Hohe Wart Tunnel formed the end of the test section (May 1986)

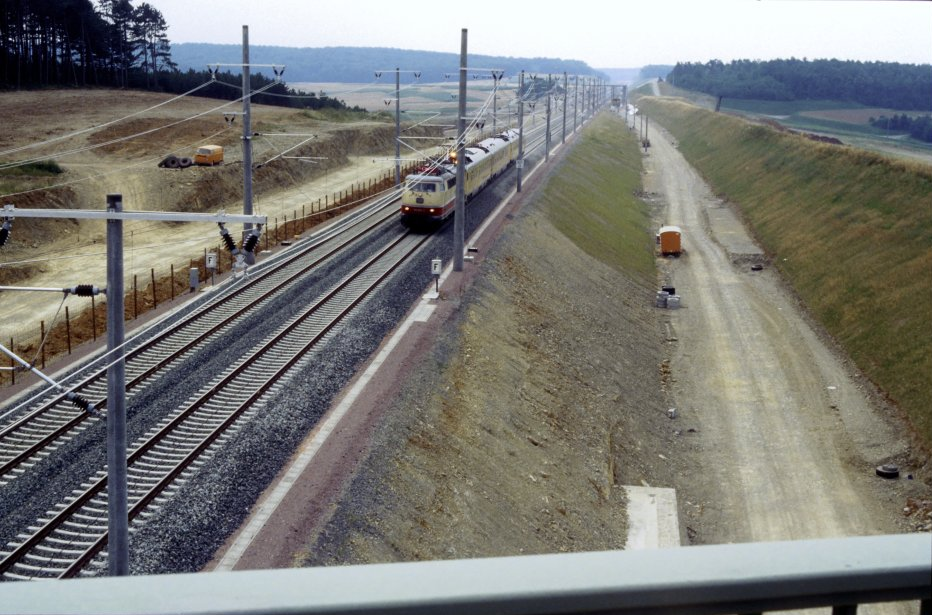
Test runs with a class 103 locomotive at Rohrbach station (July 1986)

The overhead line between the Hohe Wart transfer point and the Burgsinn depot was energised on 24 July 1986. Locomotive 103 003 ran on the section between July 15 and August 8 at speeds of up to 280 km/h (170 mph).

From August 1986, a diverse test program was run with a wide variety of rolling stock in order to gain further knowledge about railway operations at high speeds, which ultimately was used for ICE 1 series trains. On 3 September, high-speed runs with the ICE predecessor train Intercity Experimental began, which had to be cancelled on the same day after a powered end car derailed in the Burgsinn depot (due to an incorrect points setting). The train returned to the line on 10 September with only one powered end car for high speed runs of up to 290 km/h (180 mph). On 17 November 1986, a presentation run for journalists took place at 345 km/h (214 mph)—even higher speeds could not be achieved on the short section.

The countless tests that were run on the section included investigations into the contact between overhead line and pantograph, the superstructure and noise emissions. One focus of the numerous journeys with a wide variety of rolling stock was measurements of the aerodynamic loads when trains meet and the testing of various measures to improve the pressure on rolling stock. The novel eddy current brake was also subjected to a series of tests lasting several weeks in March 1987 on the section of track. From 8 April 1987, the test program temporarily switched to the (slightly longer) first section of the Mannheim–Stuttgart high-speed line. Test runs returned when scheduled operations began there on 30 May 1987.

Before the start of regular operations, the Intercity Experimental set a new world record for rail vehicles of 406.9 km/h (252.8 mph) on 1 May 1988 as part of the ICE world record run.

==== Fulda–Würzburg and Edesheim–Nörten-Hardenberg (1988) ====
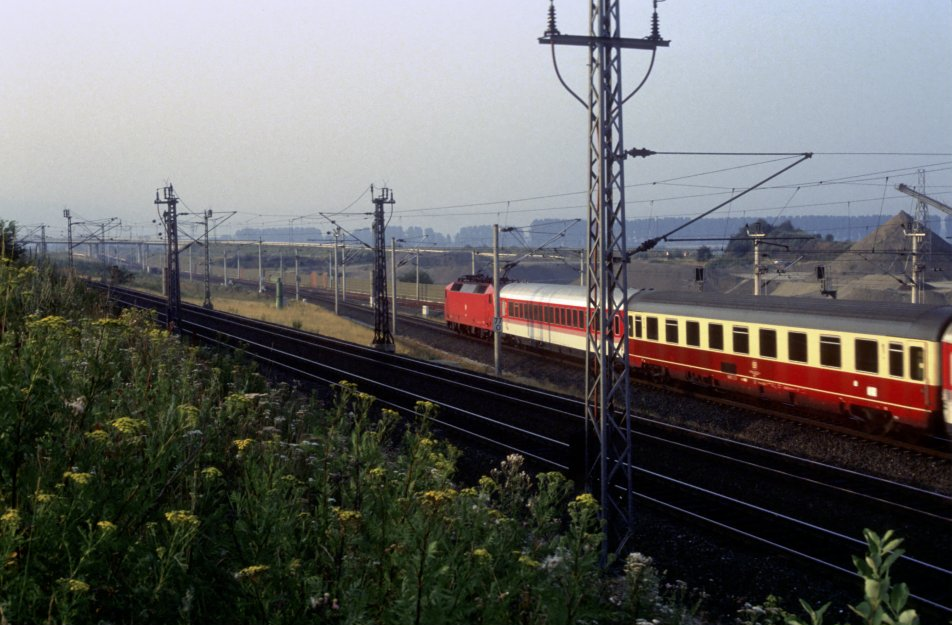
An Intercity is driving on the new line at the Edesheim junction.

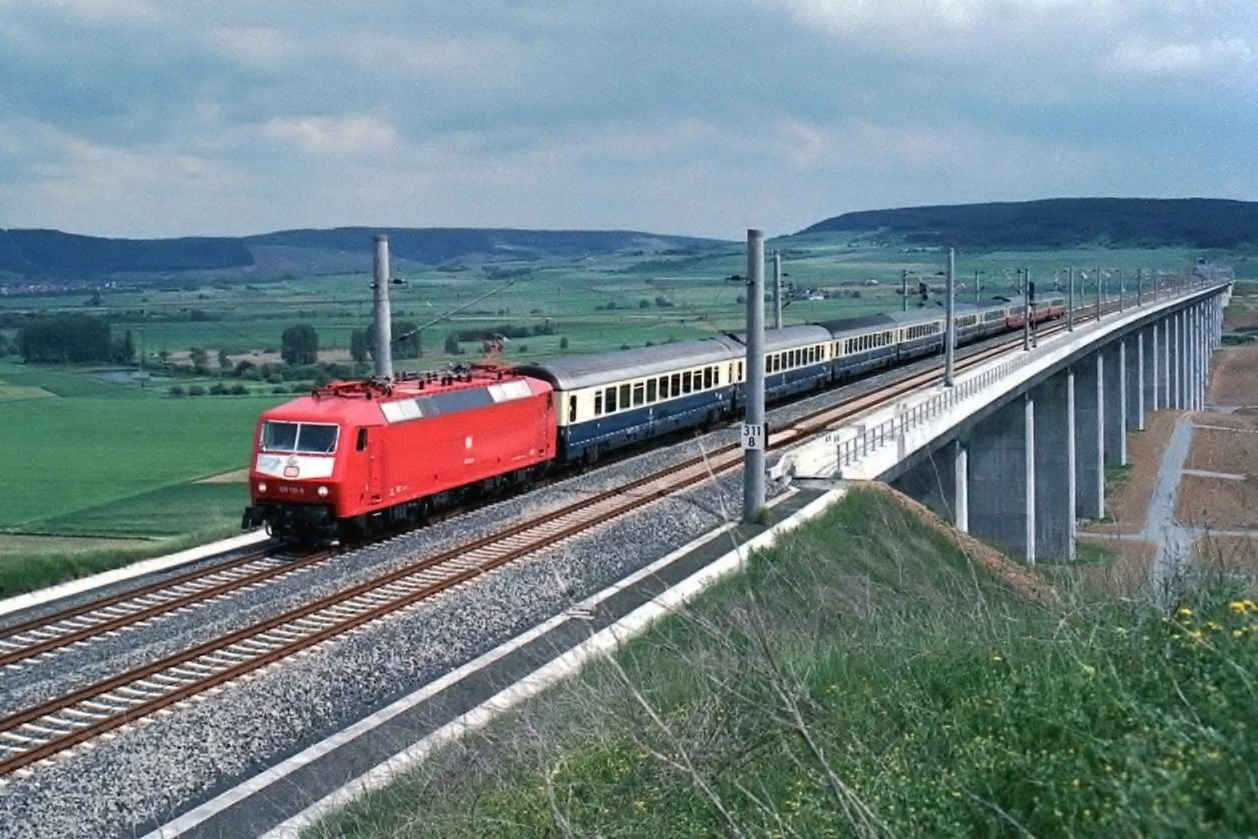
An Intercity on the first day of operation (29 May 1988) on the Bartelsgraben viaduct. Initially, the maximum speed of long-distance trains on the route was limited to 160 km/h.

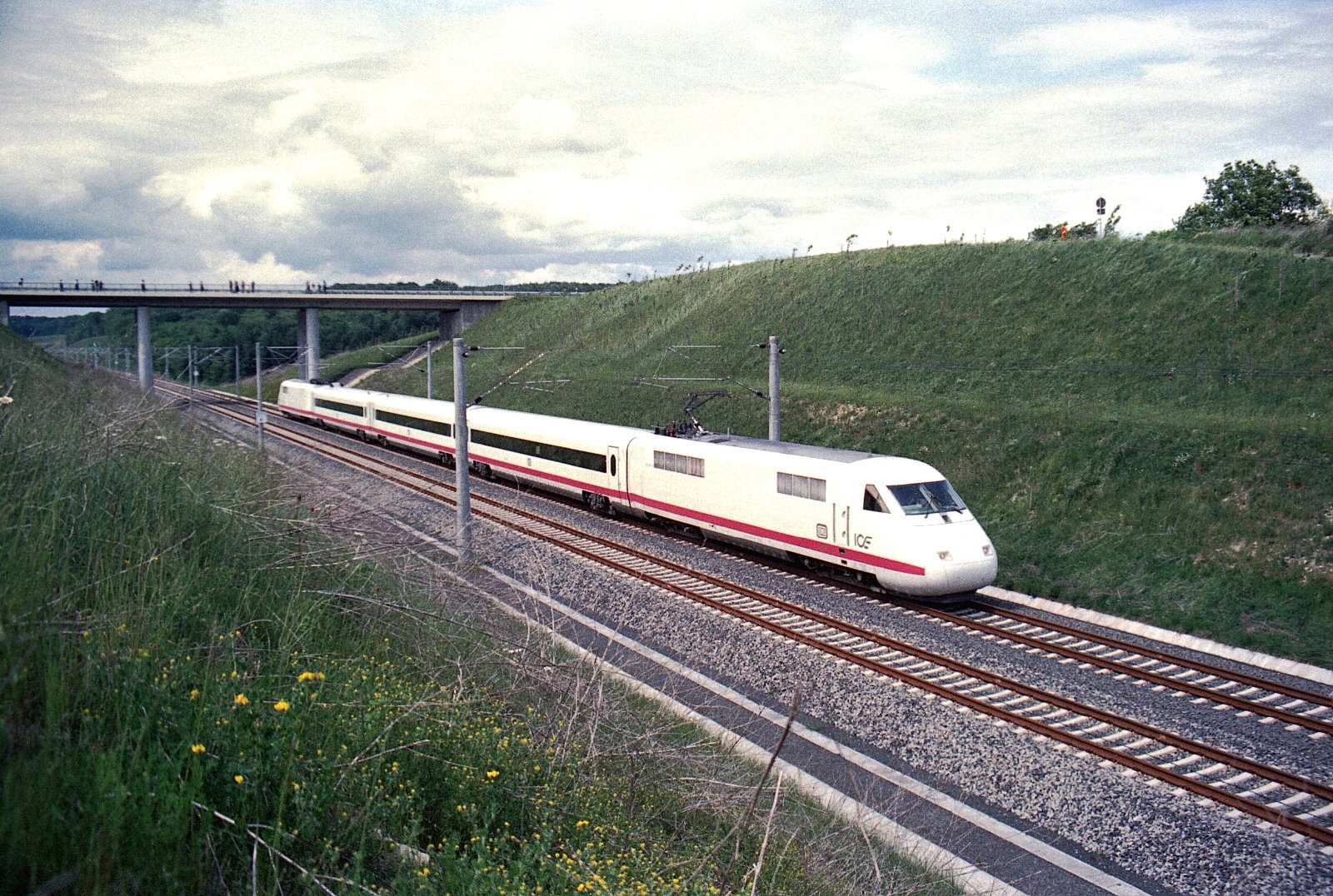
The ICE predecessor train Intercity Experimental on the way to Würzburg. On 28 and 29 May 1988, the train commuted several times on the new section of the line.

The overhead line between Fulda station and Würzburg station was energised on 18 January 1988.

The Fulda–Würzburg (94 km (58 mi) of new line) and Edesheim–Nörten-Hardenberg (near Göttingen, 13 km (8.1 mi)) sections were officially put into operation at the timetable change on 29 May 1988.

On 27 May 1988, the Würzburg–Fulda section was opened with four sets of rolling stock running parallel between Burgsinn and Mittelsinn. While the Intercity Experimental and an IC set (hauled by locomotive 120 102) ran on the new line, a historic TEE train (601 014) and the steam locomotive 50 622 ran on the parallel Flieden–Gemünden railway on this section. Federal Transport Minister Jürgen Warnke had previously officially opened the line to traffic at Fulda station. In Fulda and Würzburg, the commissioning of the DM 3.2 billion (around €1.6 billion) section was celebrated with station celebrations on 28 and 29 May 1988. Numerous shuttle trips between Würzburg and Fulda on ICE-V sets and an IC set were also offered.

As the first regular passenger train on the southern section, IC 686 Herrenchiemsee left Würzburg Hauptbahnhof at 9:17 a.m. on 29 May towards Fulda. The journey time between Fulda and Würzburg for IC services was reduced from 63 to 39 minutes when it went into operation, and the line length was reduced by 19 km (12 mi). In the first year of operation, IC/EC trains ran at regular intervals over the line during the day, supplemented by a pair of D and FD trains. Around 50 freight trains used the line at night. The introduction of the new line into Fulda station was still under construction; trains for the new line initially ran on the existing tracks and changed outside the station to the tracks of the high-speed line.

Initially, the maximum speed of the long-distance trains, which could reach speeds of up to 200 km/h (120 mph), was limited to 160 kilometres per hour (99 mph) within the tunnel. Studies had shown that higher running speeds required pressurised vehicles, which were not yet available in sufficient numbers at the time. The downpipe toilets, which were still common on the railways at the time—including in IC cars—were open to the outside and would be replaced by closed systems, since the pressure wave could otherwise reverse the flushing process, which only worked with gravity. In 1988 and 1989, a total of 160 Intercity cars of the former Deutsche Bundesbahn were built pressure-resistant in order to be able to run on the line without restriction. On 16 February 1989, the maximum speed allowed for IC trains in the tunnel was increased to 180 km/h (110 mph) (without taking travel times into account), although there were still not enough pressurised cars available.

In the first year of operation in the Fulda–Würzburg section, crosswinds on the high viaducts also proved to be critical. After storm warnings from the Offenbach weather office, freight trains were diverted over the old line for a total of 13 nights between May and August 1988. Shortly thereafter, wind measuring devices were installed on the two particularly high viaducts over the Sinn and the Fliede. Thanks to the locally precise measurements, freight trains were now able to use the lines without restrictions up to wind force 10, and beyond that at a maximum speed of 80 kilometres per hour (50 mph). Only freight trains with empty containers and flat wagons were diverted as a result of wind force ten. In addition, the first months of operation were overshadowed by a high level of damage (30 to 40 percent of the rolling stock used) in the 103, 120 and Bpmz classes. Due to problems with the emergency brake override, additional IC teams were also stationed in Fulda and Würzburg, which reinforced the train crew on the affected trains.

In 1989, multi-stage test subjects were examined between Fulda and Würzburg, from which pressure comfort criteria for Deutsche Bahn were derived, which in turn found their way into a relevant set of rules by the International Union of Railways (UIC).

Before the southern section went into operation, 760 train drivers had acquired route knowledge, including 60 Intercity train drivers and around 700 freight train drivers. For the first time, some of the six instructional trips that were common at the time in each direction were (on a trial basis) replaced by a video recording.

==== Göttingen–Nörten-Hardenberg (1990) ====
The section between Göttingen and Nörten-Hardenberg (13 km (8.1 mi)) was put into operation on 18 May 1990. Since the Linienzugbeeinflussung (LZB) train control system was not yet available, the maximum speed was 160 km/h (99 mph) until the whole line was commissioned, without any significant gain in travel time. Freight trains have been running on the new section since the end of April 1990. As late as mid-1986, it was planned to put the 53 km-long (33 mi) section between Nörten-Hardenberg and Kassel into operation in 1990.

At the end of 1979, the Bundesbahn still expected to be able to open the section between Edesheim and Göttingen in 1985.

==== Full Commissioning (1991) ====
With the start of scheduled ICE traffic on 2 June 1991, the full length of the line was put into operation; at the same time, the second new line between Mannheim and Stuttgart went into full operation. The journey time for the Intercity trains between Hanover and Würzburg was two hours and 17 minutes in the final phase and around two hours for the ICE.

During the previous high-speed runs, measuring vehicles ran on the line, starting at 160 km/h (99 mph) and increasing by 10 km/h (6.2 mph) each time. The acceptance speed of 310 km/h (190 mph) (permissible maximum speed of 280 km/h (170 mph) plus ten percent reserve) had to be achieved on at least five trips for approval. The acceptance runs were completed by 1 January 1991. This was followed by training trips for the staff. Before the first two new lines went into service, 1,000-2,000 drivers undertook route familiarisation journeys and were familiarised with the technical features (e.g. cab signalling, emergency brake override).

The new line played a role in two television commercials of then Deutsche Bundesbahn as part of the Unternehmen Zukunft ("company future") campaign, which particularly emphasised the ecological advantages of the new lines.

=== Effects ===
With the commissioning of the high-speed line, the travel time between Hamburg and Munich in long-distance rail passenger transport fell from initially 7:35 hours (1984) or 7:06 hours (1986, with timetable optimisation) to 6:39 hours (1988, after commissioning Würzburg–Fulda) or around 6:00 hours (1991, full commissioning). After the commissioning of the Nuremberg–Ingolstadt high-speed railway, the travel time was just over 5:30 hours.

Between Kassel and Göttingen, the route length was reduced by around 30 km (19 mi), and the previously necessary long detour via Eichenberg was no longer necessary.

The new line permanently took up 937 ha (2,320 acres) of land, which is an average of 2.9 ha per km (4.4 acres per mile) of line.

=== Cost ===
The total cost of the project was DM 11,874 million (projected billing total as of mid-1994, calculated by adding the actual expenditure over the financial years). Tunnels and bridges account for about half of the total cost of the line.

The costs rose steadily during the course of construction. In 1977, DM 8.05 billion (around €4.11 billion) was estimated, in the spring of 1982 the total had risen to DM 10.5 billion (around €5.4 billion). In June 1982, costs of DM 11.7 billion (about €6.0 billion) was estimated at 1981 prices. DM 11.80 billion was expected in 1983 (at 1983 prices). At the beginning of October 1984 (2 January 1984 prices) a total cost of DM 11.1 billion was estimated. The main reason given for exceeding the originally planned costs in 1994 was increased construction costs (70 percent increase between 1972 and 1991).

A reassessment of the economic and business benefits on behalf of the Federal Ministry of Transport resulted in a benefit–cost ratio of 4.1 and a revenue–cost ratio of 3.1 for the line in mid-1983. At the end of 1984, Deutsche Bundesbahn announced cost reductions and acceleration of construction for the first two new lines. Completion would have taken place in 1991, and the total cost of DM 14.7 billion would be DM 850 million lower than originally planned (1 January 1984 prices). The authority justified this development, among other things, with cost-saving tunnel construction methods, more accurate estimates during the realisation of the projects and the competitive situation in the construction industry. Completion was planned at this time for 1993 (for the Fulda–Würzburg section: 1989). DM 11.126 billion was allotted to the new line from Hanover to Würzburg. These costs were also assumed in mid-1985. In 1986, the costs were estimated at DM 10.995 billion.

=== Further development ===
In November 1988, a new Talgo set reached a speed of 291 km/h (181 mph) on the line.

After commissioning, in 1991 and 1992, the tunnels were equipped with radio technology for C-Netz, VHF radio and the Eurosignal pager system. The tunnel radio system was operational until 31 December 2000. The line was upgraded around 2005/2006 for public GSM mobile communications. Numerous newly erected transmitting stations—including tunnel radio systems—ensure constant reception in carriages for mobile phones.

In 1993, an overhead line that could be used at speeds of up to 400 km/h (250 mph) was erected on a test section between Hanover and Göttingen to test the possibility of further increases in speed on the new lines. The Nantenbach Curve (connecting curve from Würzburg towards Frankfurt am Main) was completed in 1994. On 4 May 1998, a Eurotrain set reached a speed of 316 km/h (196 mph) near Orxhausen. In 1994 a Talgo unit pulled by the Intercity Experimental reached a speed of 360 km/h (220 mph) between Hanover and Göttingen.

The track's substructure proved to be too hard during operation, which meant the ballast wore out faster than expected. A renovation with sleeper anchours planned for 2019 could not wait. From 23 April to 8 May 2016, the section between Hanover and Kassel was closed for cleaning and partial replacement of the ballast. A total of 130,000 tons of new gravel was to be placed.

At the beginning of May 2016, Deutsche Bahn put out to tender the planning of comprehensive track renewal between Hannover Messe/Laatzen and Jühnde. About 178 km (111 mi) of track and 75 sets of points were to be renewed and six sets of points were to be dismantled. At the end of December 2015, the Federal Railway Authority had already granted planning approval for the dismantling of the Giften and Sudheim transfer points and a total of six sets of points in the depots.

Fiber-optic sensors were tested on the Fulda–Würzburg section (as of 2016).

The general overhaul began in 2019 with the renewal of tracks, points and technology. For the first section between Hanover and Göttingen, there was a complete closure of the track between 11 June and 14 December 2019. In October 2019, the section was reopened for heavy traffic between 5 p.m. and 7 a.m. The diversion took place via the Hanoverian Southern Railway along the Leine Valley, which resulted in a travel time extension of 30 to 45 minutes and train cancellations. The overhaul of the section from Göttingen to Kassel followed between 24 April and 16 July 2021. During the closure, trains were diverted via Hameln–Altenbeken–Warburg (without a stop in Göttingen), Eichenberg–Hann Münden or Eichenberg–Bebra (without a stop in Kassel). The estimated cost was €114 million. The section between Fulda and Würzburg was renovated from 22 June to 10 December 2022. The section between the Rohrbach depot and Würzburg was put back into operation in advance and gradually on 17 October 2022. The remaining Kassel–Fulda section will be renovated from April 17 to 9 December 2023, with 163 km (101 mi) and 70 sets of points being renewed on an 85 km (53 mi) section. The refurbishment should be completed by the end of 2023.

In November 2022, Deutsche Bahn applied for a first partial renewal of Rauheberg Tunnel, which is to be carried out in 2023 and 2024. This requires an expected 82-day total closure in the section between Jühnde and Kattenbühl.

=== World record runs ===
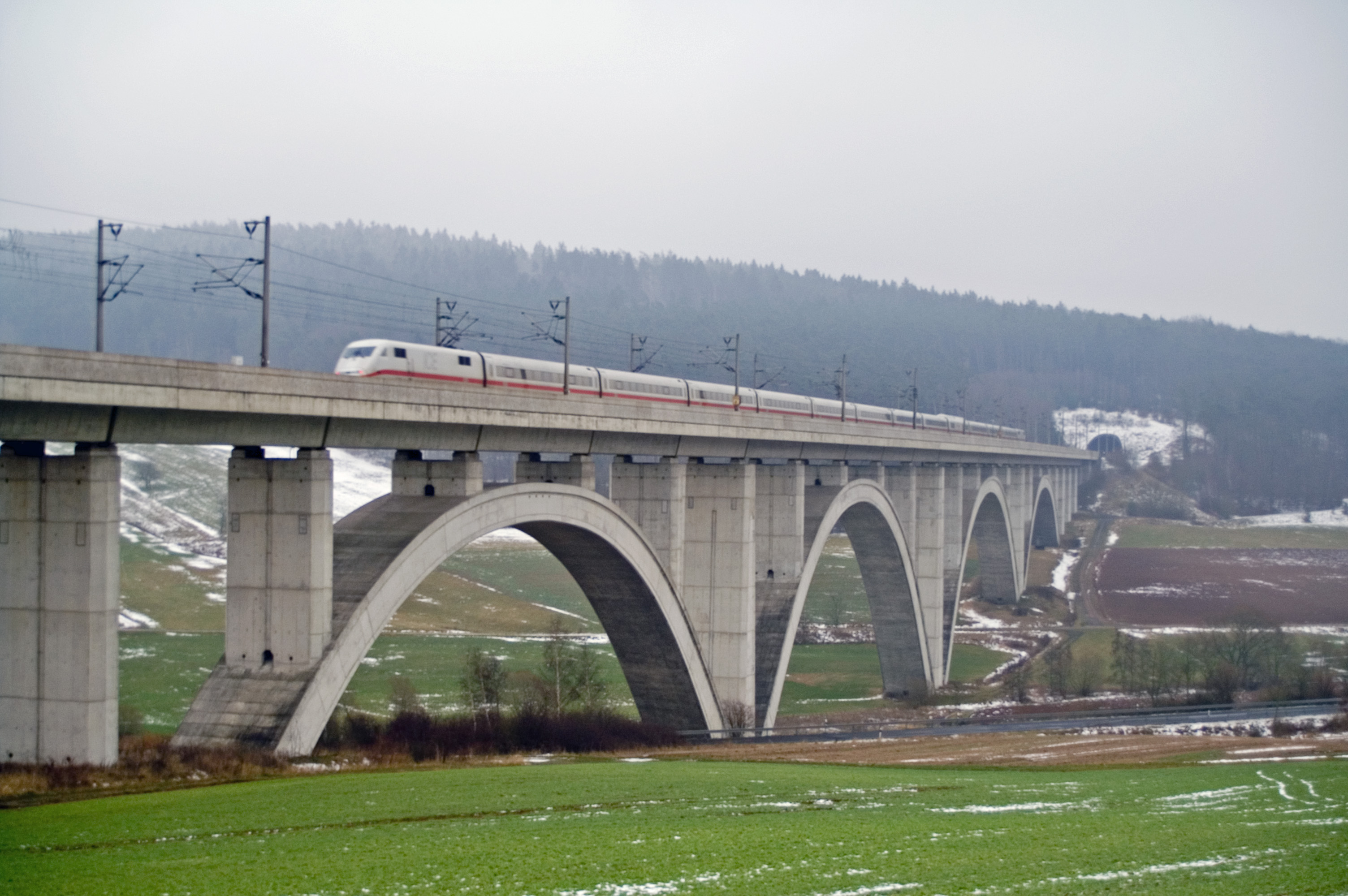
ICE 1 on Wälsebach viaduct

As part of the ICE world record run on 1 May 1988, the Intercity Experimental test train set a world speed record for rail vehicles. It reached a speed of 406.9 km/h (252.8 mph) in the Würzburg–Fulda section, north of the Einmalberg tunnel (route kilometre 287.956). The track and train were specially prepared for the record run. The world record lasted just over a year and a half before it was surpassed on 5 December 1989 by the French TGV Atlantique with 482.4 km/h.

As early as 17 November 1986, the Intercity Experimental set a new speed record for three-phase vehicles in Mühlberg tunnel at 345 km/h (214 mph).

With a speed of 310 km/h (190 mph), the EuroSprinter 64 P locomotive 127 001-6 set a new world record for three-phase locomotives on 6 August 1993 between Würzburg and Fulda.

=== Accidents ===
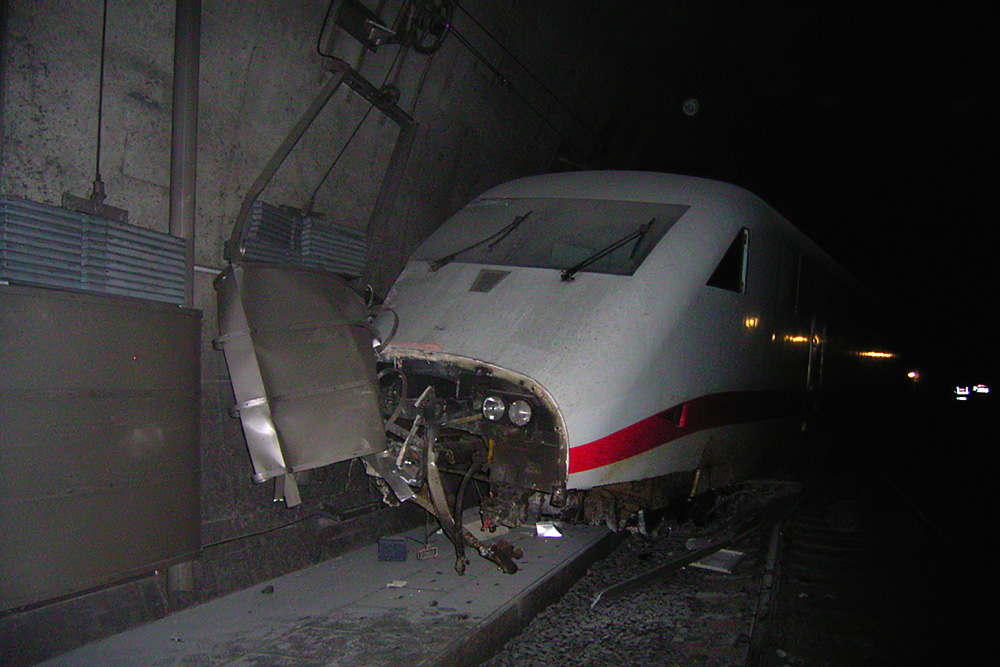
On 26 April 2008, an ICE 1 power car came to a stop on the tunnel wall of the Landrücken Tunnel (near Fulda).

- On 3 September 1986, the day of its first trip on the line, the ICE predecessor train, the Intercity Experimental derailed in Burgsinn depot when the powered end car 410 001 crossed a set of points at the junction to the existing line.
- On 29 June 1991, two freight trains collided in a tunnel near Jühnde. After a disruption, one of the engine drivers switched off the LZB train equipment and ran past a stop signal.
- In the first half of 1999, three accidents occurred within a short period of time due to Italian sliding wall wagons, in which the Mengershausen, Ersrode and Gehrenrode sets of points were destroyed, with the first two not being rebuilt.
  - On 2 March 1999, a wagon of a freight train derailed in Leinebusch tunnel and caught fire. Fighting the fire with the rescue train was unsatisfactory.
  - On 28 April 1999, four wagons of a freight train derailed when entering Schalkenberg tunnel due to a wagon overheating.
  - On 13 May 1999, an Italian freight wagon, which was the last wagon in the ICG 50710 from Kornwestheim to Bremen, derailed at kilometre 58. Over an 8 km (5.0 mi) section, the concrete sleepers were smashed and signalling equipment damaged. The damage was in the millions, the opposite track remained closed until the following day and the accident-affected track was closed until 23 May 1999. After a class 245 sliding wall wagon was the cause of an accident for the third time in a row, the Federal Railway Authority prohibited the operation of these wagons at more than 60 km/h.
- On 26 April 2008, at 9:05 p.m., ICE 885 came to a standstill in Landrücken Tunnel, damaged, after colliding with sheep entering the tunnel. Ten of the twelve cars and both power cars of the 14-car train derailed. 19 passengers were injured, four of them moderately. This was the first derailment of an ICE in normal operation in a tunnel. The section between Fulda and Burgsinn depot remained closed for several weeks. Long-distance traffic was diverted via the old North–South railway in this section, with travel time extended by around 30 minutes.

=== Outlook ===
The preferred option of the Hanau–Würzburg/Fulda–Erfurt high-speed railway is to be linked to the high-speed line at Mittelkalbach. The preferred solution, option IV, named in June 2018 is to be included in the spatial planning process. This would allow the high-speed Fulda–Frankfurt passenger service between Fulda and the Kalbach tunnel to use the high-speed line.

The first expert draft published in October 2018 provided for a travel time of exactly 120 minutes for the proposed German clock-face timetable between the stations in Hanover and Würzburg. With a basic service of five and a half trains per hour in each direction, the section from Fulda to the planned Kalbach junction on the new Gelnhausen–Kalbach line would be the most heavily used section of the line in the future. The second expert draft submitted in 2019 provided for six trains per hour in each direction south of Fulda to Kalbach; one and a half of them continue towards Munich. In the third expert draft submitted in 2020, six and a half trains per hour in each direction were planned between Fulda and Kalbach and one and a half between Kalbach and Würzburg, which means that the busiest and least frequented sections of the entire HSR connect directly to each other. As part of the draft, modified sets of points are planned in the Fulda Bronnzell yard section. Expenditure of €22 million at 2015 prices are planned for this. As part of the third expert draft, it is now also planned to run the connection from the high-speed line towards Blankenheim (by Bebra) at 230 km/h (140 mph) instead of the previously planned 200 km/h (120 mph).

== Operations ==
Year	1990 (1980 federal transport plan estimate)	1992	2007	2018
Passenger trains	88	76	126	110
Freight trains	152	70	36	26
Total	240	146	152	136

The new line is scheduled to be used by long-distance passenger and freight trains. It is primarily available for long-distance passenger trains between 5:30 a.m. and 11:00 p.m. The rest of the time, freight trains have priority in operations. Passenger trains then have to use the longer and slower old line.

While the number of pairs of passenger trains on the Göttingen–Fulda section rose steadily from 38 (1992) to 63 (2007), the number of pairs of freight trains fell from 35 (1992) to 22 (2005) and 18 (2007). The load on the existing route developed in the opposite direction: the number of pairs of freight trains rose from 66 (1992) to 104 (2007), while the number of pairs of passenger trains fell from 45 to 35 in the same period. In 2007, 53 ICE and IC trains and 33 fast freight trains (120 km/h (75 mph), some 160 km/h (99 mph)) ran in the busiest section, between Göttingen and Kassel, per working day and direction. 77 slow freight trains (90 km/h (56 mph)) and 19 regional trains ran on the old line between Göttingen and Eichenberg.

In August 1994, around 100 passenger and 70 freight trains used the line every day. In 1995, the Kassel–Göttingen section was used by an average of 100 passenger trains and 65 freight trains daily. The 1980 Federal Transport Routes Plan provided for 88 passenger and 152 freight trains in 1990.

The profitability calculation of the project was based on 240 trains per day, about half each for passenger and freight trains. In addition, network-wide effects were applied. In 1994, reasons given for the actually lower capacity utilisation included the incomplete upgrade of the rest of the network (on which the forecast is based) and the "unsatisfactory development" of rail freight traffic.

=== Passenger services ===
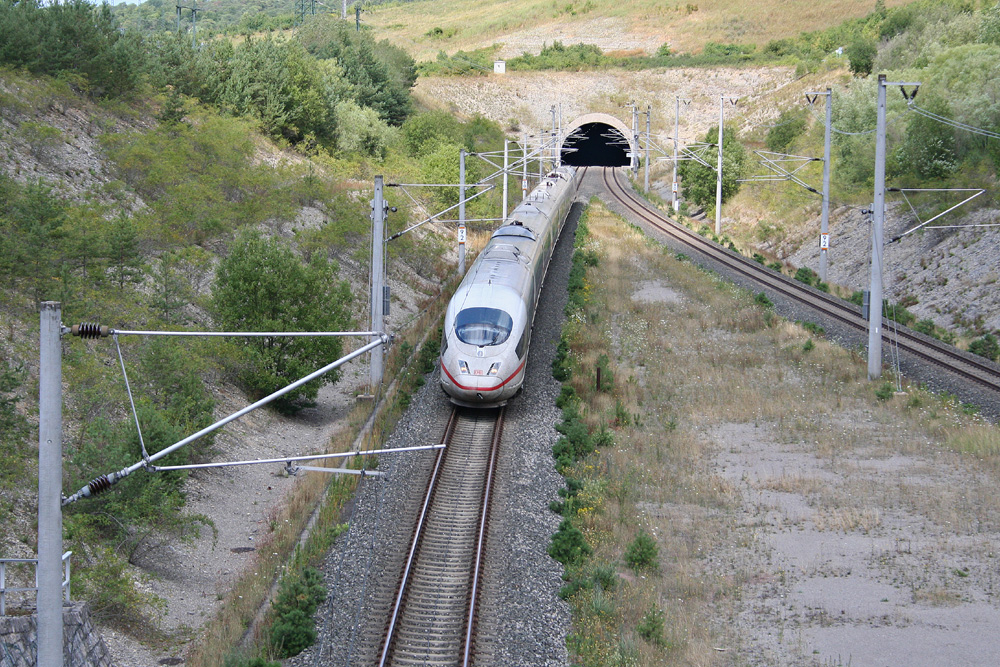
An ICE 3 set from Frankfurt am Main on the way to Würzburg. At the southern end of the Nantenbach Curve these trains use a 25 km (16 mi) section of the new line to Würzburg.

The new line is scheduled to be used by ICE and IC trains for passenger traffic. In the 2023 timetable year, the following ICE lines ran on the line at regular intervals (mostly every two hours):

1. from Hamburg-Altona via Hanover–Göttingen–Kassel-Wilhelmshöhe–Frankfurt to Basel/Zurich (ICE/ECE 20) or Stuttgart (ICE 22)
2. from Hamburg-Altona or Bremen via Hanover–Göttingen–Kassel-Wilhelmshöhe–Fulda–Würzburg to Munich (ICE 25)
3. from Berlin via Wolfsburg–Brunswick–Hildesheim–Göttingen–Kassel-Wilhelmshöhe–Fulda–Hanau–Frankfurt to Basel (ICE 12) or Frankfurt (ICE 13)
4. Hamburg–Hanover–Kassel-Wilhelmshöhe–Giessen–Frankfurt–Darmstadt–Karlsruhe (ICE 26)
5. Cologne–Frankfurt–Würzburg–Nuremberg–Ingolstadt–Munich (ICE 41)
6. Cologne–Koblenz–Frankfurt–Würzburg–Nuremberg–Passau–Vienna (ICE 91)

The overlapping of several lines creates at least one hourly service between the intermediate stations of the new line, in the section between Fulda and Hanover at least two pairs of trains run per hour, between Kassel and Göttingen three. In addition, a few trains run between Göttingen and Würzburg as ICE 24 services, some on weekends, some as repeaters.

The two daily ICE Sprinter train pairs between Frankfurt am Main and Berlin and the ICE Sprinter from Hamburg via Hanover to Frankfurt also use the route. Some Intercity trains also run over the line. In the 1990s, some Interregio lines also ran over the line. Regional traffic only takes place on short sections between the stations and nearby links to the older lines, for example between Ihringshausen and Kassel-Wilhelmshöhe.

With three scheduled ICE train pairs per hour in each direction, the section between the Hildesheim loop near Hanover and Fulda is the busiest section of the new line. With one pair of trains running every hour, the approximately 60 km (37 mi) long new line section between Fulda and the Nantenbach Curve near Gemünden is the section of the line that is least utilised by scheduled passenger traffic.

In passenger traffic, a slight decrease in the number of trains is expected in the southern section of the line by 2030 (as of 2018).

=== Freight transport ===
The line is designed for freight trains weighing up to 2500 t, which require two locomotives. A train load of around 1350 t is possible with one locomotive. During the night hours (11 p.m. to 5 a.m.) the new line is used for freight traffic. No dangerous goods trains and no trains with open, loaded car transport wagons are allowed to operate on most of the line. Freight trains carrying passenger carriages are not allowed to run on part of the line.

In the 1993/1994 timetable, around 20 freight trains ran on the Fulda–Kassel section in each direction between 1 a.m. and 5 a.m. on weekdays. In 2009, 62 freight trains ran daily between 10 p.m. and 6 a.m. on the new line; no freight trains ran between 6 a.m. and 10 p.m. In the Göttingen–Kassel section, the peak load of freight trains in 2003 was at midnight (eight southbound trains) and northbound at 1 a.m. (five northbound trains). When passenger and freight trains meet in tunnels, for example due to freight trains being diverted via the new line, the maximum speed of all trains in the affected section is reduced to 160 km/h (99 mph) (as of 2001).

The standard speed of freight trains on the line is 120 km/h (75 mph). This speed can be reached by freight trains running under LZB with conventional brakes.

Before the opening of the new line, a number of freight cars with a maximum speed of 160 km/h were purchased for the line from the end of 1990. As part of the high-speed freight transport project, freight trains running at speeds of 160 km/h on the Hamburg–Munich and Bremen–Stuttgart lines ran on the line from 1991 to 1995. Pulled by class 120 locomotives, these InterCargoExpress trains ran overnight between northern and southern Germany. The service was discontinued in 1995 for economic reasons and resumed in 2000 with the Parcel InterCity service. Around 2001, a series of 120 km/h fast freight trains used the line at night at six-minute intervals.

While around 20 trains per day and direction operated in the southern section of the line between Mottgers and Würzburg in 2018, the forecast in the Federal Transport Routes Plan 2030 expects up to 74.

Investigations into using the ICE-G for 250 km/h (160 mph) fast freight trains have not been put into practice.

=== Line speeds ===
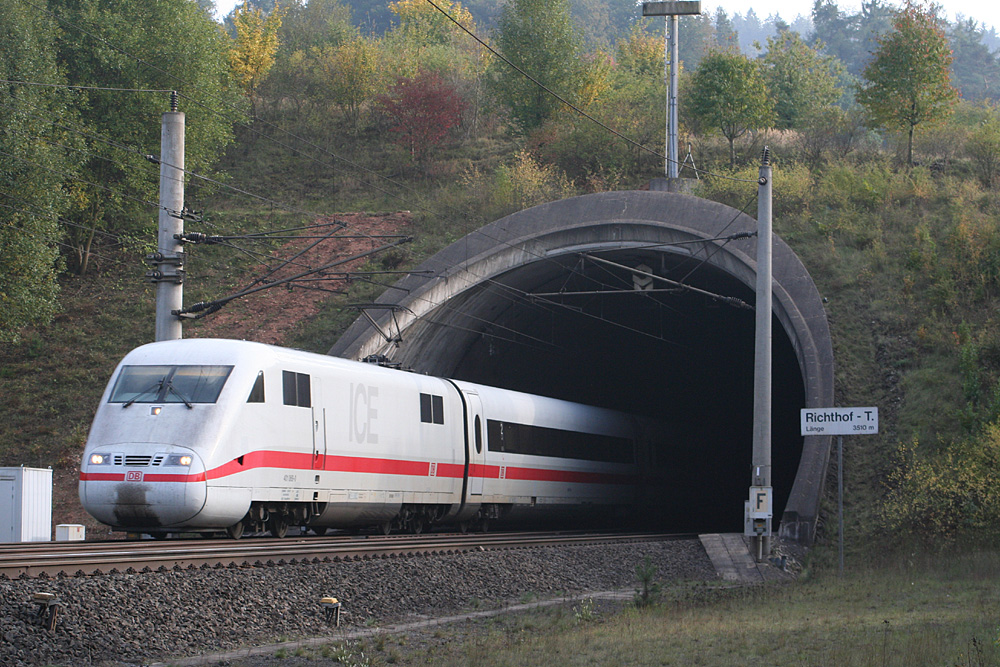
An ICE 1 set leaves Richthof tunnel.

Large sections of the new line are approved for a top speed of 280 km/h (170 mph). In tunnels, the maximum speed is generally limited to 250 km/h (160 mph). The transit speeds at Fulda, Kassel-Wilhelmshöhe and Göttingen stations are between 100 km/h (62 mph) and 140 km/h (87 mph).

At the time of commissioning, the maximum line speed was 250 km/h (160 mph), with a permitted exceeding of up to 280 km/h in the event of delays. In 1998, the maximum speed according to the timetable for trains running on this line was reduced to a continuous 250 km/h. Trains that are sensitive to side winds, including the ICE 2 multiple units with a leading (pushed) control car and locomotives with relatively light end cars (ICE 3 and ICE T) are only allowed to travel at 200 km/h (120 mph) in some sections of the line.

The maximum permissible speed in the city of Hanover is 160 km/h (99 mph). The LZB train control that is active from kilometre 16 (as of October 2006) only allows higher speeds from this point. At the southern end of the new line, the maximum speed is reduced from 250 to 220 km/h on the Veitshöchheim Main Viaduct, followed by a reduction to 160 km/h in the subsequent Roßberg tunnel. The ramp at Würzburg station can also be operated at this speed. The entrance to Würzburg station is up to 80 km/h (50 mph), the exit in the direction of Hanover is up to 100 km/h.

Exceptional approval for 280 km/h operation with ICE 1 (1995)

General exception approval for 280 km/h operation (1996)

Deviating from the maximum speed of 250 km/h permitted in § 40 No. 2 S. 1 of the EBO, the Federal Ministry of Transport (according to § 3 Para. 1 No. 1 EBO) allowed a maximum line speed for ICE 1 multiple units by a determination of 24 March 1995 of 280 km/h, combined with special safety requirements. On 27 December 1996, this and other exemptions were replaced by a general, vehicle-independent regulation. This provided for a reduction in the permissible speed in the tunnel to 250 km/h insofar as a technical system could not prevent passenger and freight trains from crossing.

At the end of the 1980s, containers used in Combined transport proved to be critical for encounters between passenger and freight trains in tunnels, which made it necessary to reduce the pressure load when trains met passenger trains and thus required a reduction in the speed of the ICE sets.

When the timetable changed on 13 December 2009, the permissible speed for ICE 1 and ICE 2 trains between the Krieberg and Eichenberg tunnels (Hannover–Göttingen section) was increased to 280 km/h. A continuous increase in speed to 280 km/h in the tunnels of the new line was being investigated. The necessary safe separation of passenger and freight trains was to be implemented by making changes to the existing signalling technology.

As part of the "Fulda–Burgsinn Mixed traffic" project, a three-week pilot operation starting on 23 November 2009 was tested in the 44-kilometre section, under which it is possible to have freight trains run during the day. Software was intended to prevent passenger and freight trains from meeting in tunnels. For this purpose, two tunnel areas with three or five tunnels, separated by the Mottgers overtaking loop, were formed. A reliable distinction between the types of trains is ensured by measuring the wheelbases at 24 points using wheel sensors, which determine the wheelbases with an accuracy of 15 mm (0.59 in).

The system would also be used on other new lines in the future. It should be further optimised and used in the future if required. In a further development stage, among other things, impermissible traffic signals are to be prevented and the responsible traffic controllers at the Burgsinn depot and the Frankfurt am Main operations centre are to be relieved.

A secure signalling solution was sought according to DB information from 2018. Implementation was not foreseen. If the system were to be implemented, up to 20 additional routes could be added in each direction between Fulda and Burgsinn during daylight hours. A similar system has been in use on the Nuremberg–Erfurt high-speed railway since around 2018.

Since around 2020, there have been considerations to increase the line speed to increase punctuality. With test runs by DB Systemtechnik in December 2022 with a class 403 multiple unit between Würzburg and Fulda, multi-year studies began to increase the maximum speed to 300 km/h (190 mph) in regular operation.

== See also ==
- High-speed rail in Germany

== Sources ==
- Neubaustrecke Hannover–Würzburg. Der Landrückentunnel. Vortrieb, Ausbau, Ausstattung und Kosten (brochure) (in German). Nürnberg: Deutsche Bundesbahn, Bundesbahndirektion Nürnberg, Projektgruppe H/W Süd der Bahnbauzentrale. December 1984.
- Hörstel, Jürgen; Niedt, Marcus (1991). ICE – Neue Züge für neue Strecken (in German). Zürich/Wiesbaden: Orell-Füssli-Verlag. ISBN 3-280-01994-X.
- Lottes, Gerd, ed. (c. 1992). "Auf neuen Schienen durch Spessart und Rhön". Natur und Technik (in German). Vol. 6. Hamburg: Hans Christians Druckerei.
- Münchschwander, Peter, ed. (1990). Das Hochgeschwindigkeitssystem der Deutschen Bundesbahn (in German). Heidelberg: R. v. Decker's Verlag G. Schenk. ISBN 3-7685-3089-2.
- Reimers, Knut; Linkerhägner, Wilhelm, eds. (1987). Wege in die Zukunft: Neubau- und Ausbaustrecken der DB (in German). Darmstadt: Hestra. ISBN 3-7771-0200-8.
- Rudolph, Ernst (1989). Eisenbahn auf neuen Wegen: Hannover–Würzburg; Mannheim–Stuttgart (in German). Darmstadt: Hestra-Verlag. ISBN 3-7771-0216-4.
- Seyferth, Joachim (1983). Die Neubaustrecken der Deutschen Bundesbahn: Mannheim–Stuttgart, Hannover–Würzburg. Schiene (in German). Vol. 1. Wiesbaden: Josey-Verlag. ISBN 3-926669-00-4.
