= Werra Viaduct, Hedemünden =

Coordinates: 51°24′19″N 9°42′54″E

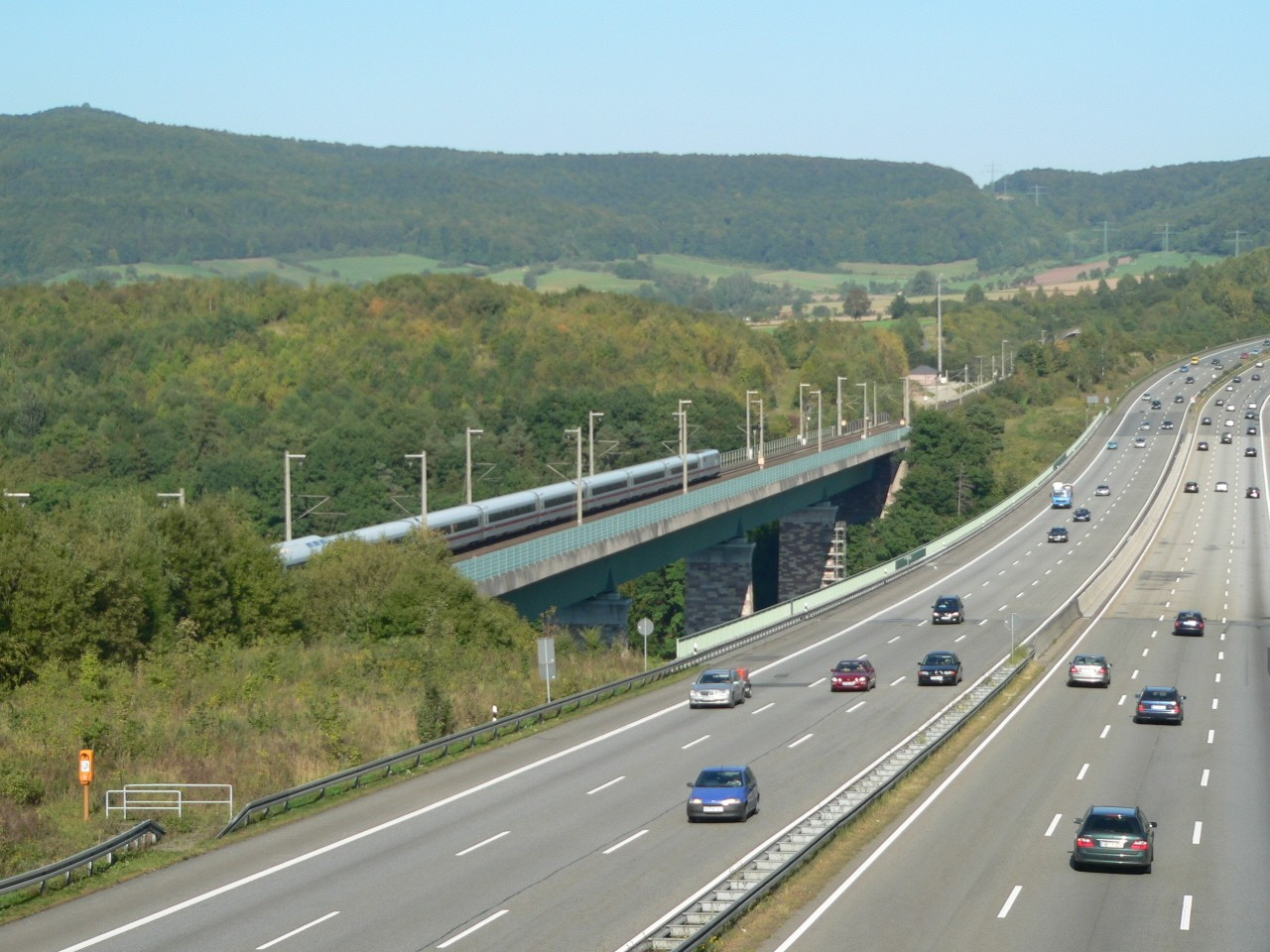
Motorway and railway bridge

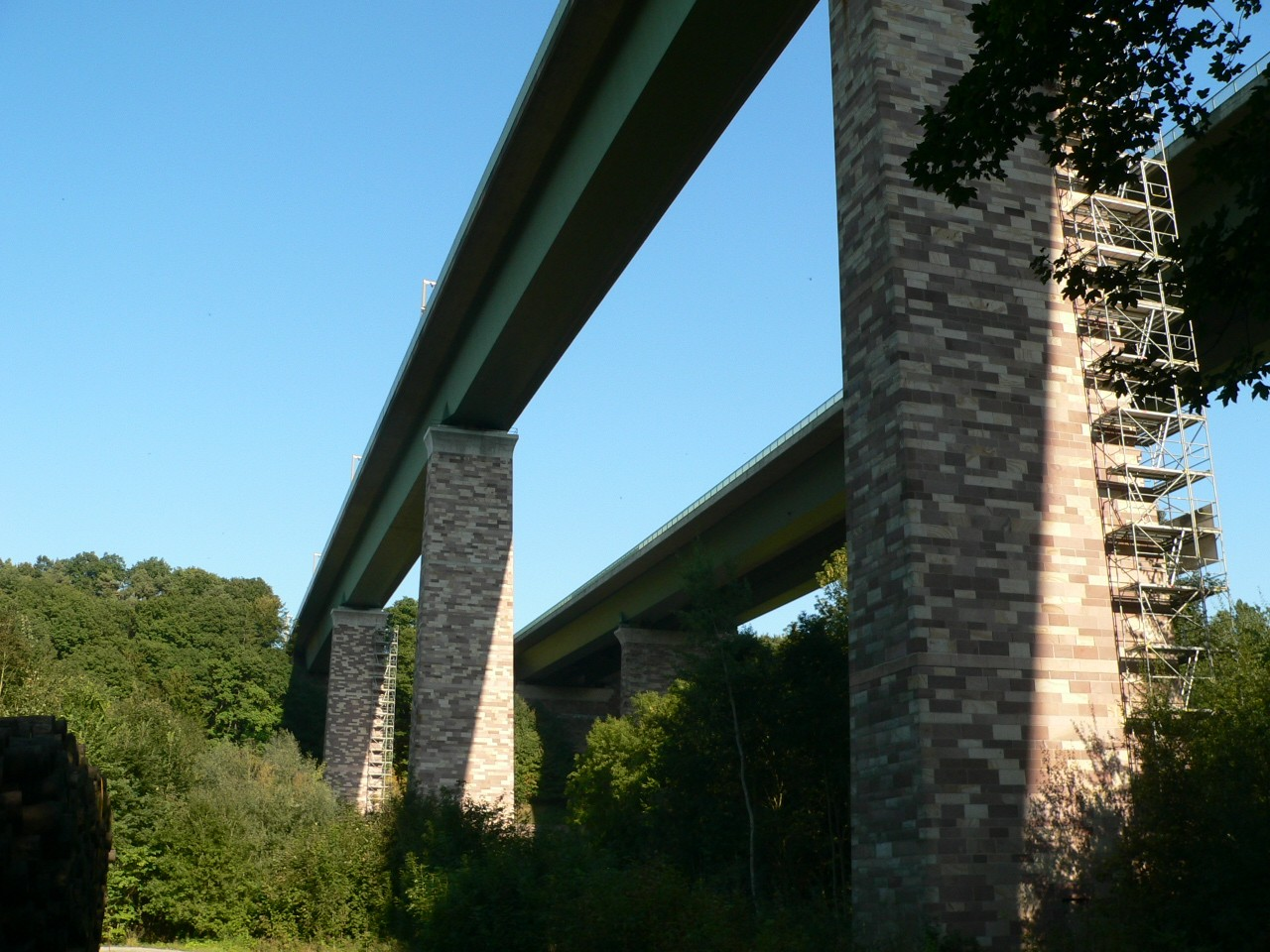
Bridges as seen from the valley below

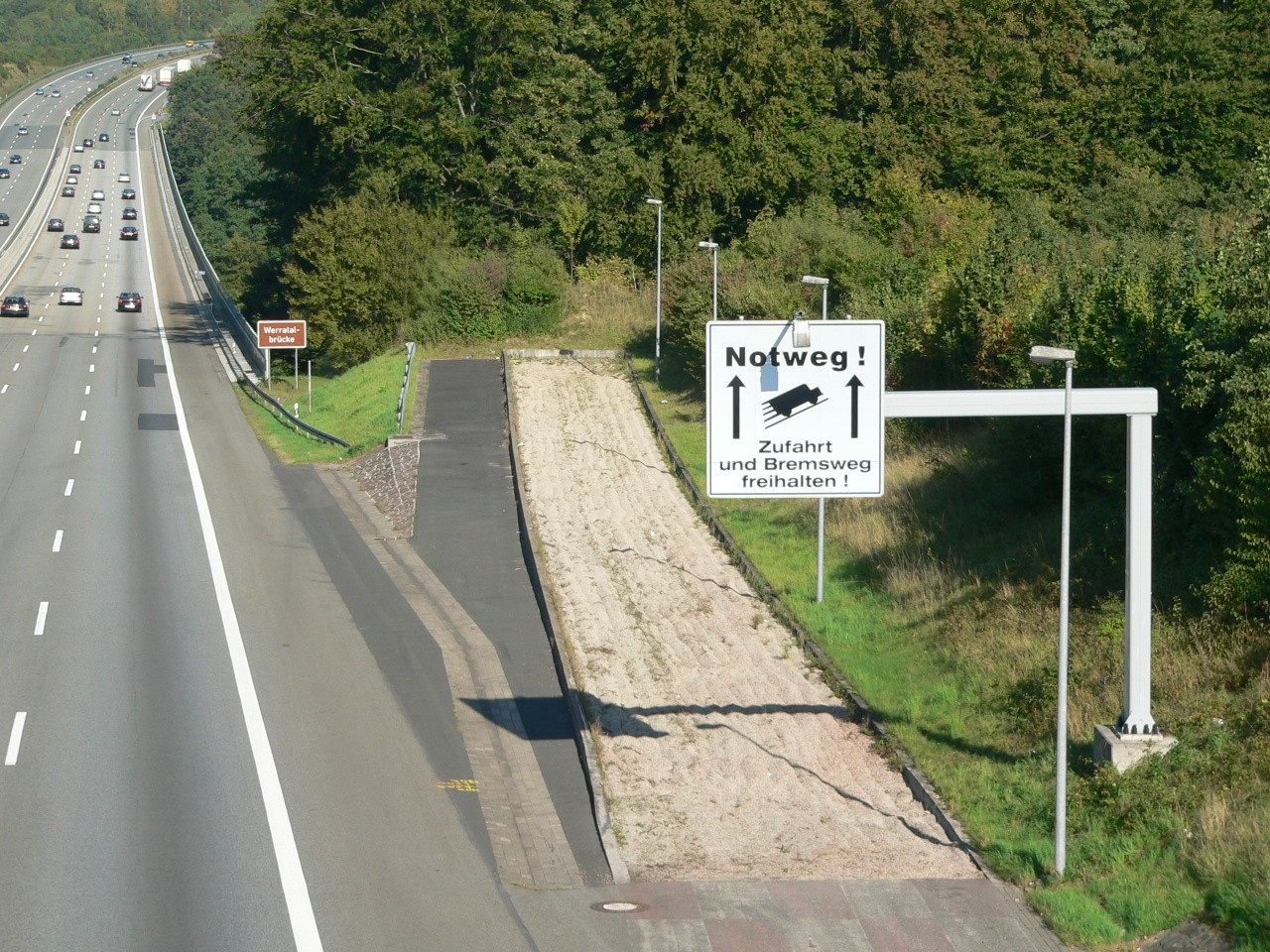
Emergency lane for runaway HGVs on the motorway bridge approach

The Werra viaducts near Hedemünden, Germany are two bridges crossing the valley of the river Werra. They are located in southern Lower Saxony and provide crossings for the A 7 motorway and the Hanover-Würzburg high-speed rail line. The bridges are located 33 metres apart from each other.

The bridges cross the Werra river, the B 80 and the Kassel to Eichenberg railway line at a maximum height of 59 metres.

== Autobahn bridge ==
A first bridge was erected at the site in 1937. The bridge was destroyed near the end of World War II, and replaced by a temporary bridge until 1952, when a new bridge was built. As the autobahn was expanded to six lanes in the early 1990s, the bridge had to be expanded and rebuilt, lasting from 1987 to 1993. It has a span of 415.9 metres. The bridge is notorious for its strong winds, therefore a speed limit has been established on the approach from the Kassel side, which is situated on a steep hillside, with an inclination of up to 8.5%. There is a speed camera situated on the northbound lanes, close to the actual bridge.

== Railway bridge ==
The railway bridge was built from 1986 to 1989 as part of the Hanover-Würzburg high-speed rail line. It has a span of 415.5 metres and links the Münden Tunnel to the Rauheberg Tunnel.

== Literature ==
- Bundesministerium für Verkehr: Brücken der Bundesfernstrassen 1994. Verkehrsblatt-Verlag, Dortmund, 1994. ISBN 3-89273-070-9
- Knut Reimers und Wilhelm Linkerhägner: Wege in die Zukunft. Neubau- und Ausbaustrecken der DB. Hestra Verlag Darmstadt, 1987. ISBN 3-7771-0200-8
