= Nantenbach Curve =

Nantenbach curve
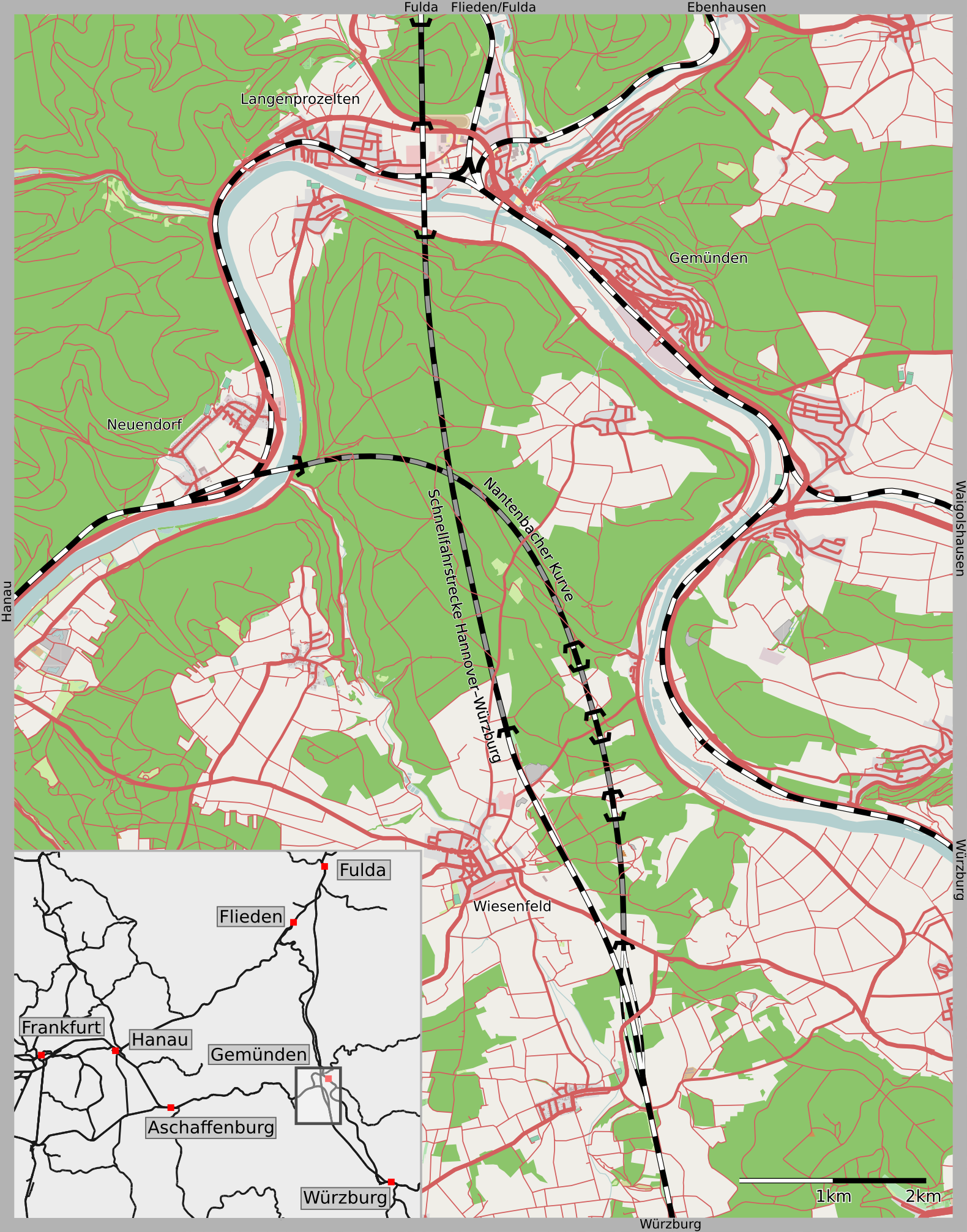

Overview
- Native name: Nantenbacher Kurve or Verbindungskurve Nantenbach
- Line number: 5216
- Locale: Bavaria, Germany

Technical
- Line length: 11.3 km (7.0 mi)
- Track gauge: 1,435 mm (4 ft 8 1/2 in) standard gauge
- Minimum radius: 2,650 m (8,690 ft)
- Electrification: 15 kV/16.7 Hz AC overhead catenary
- Operating speed: 200 km/h (125 mph) (maximum)

The Nantenbach Curve (German: Nantenbacher Kurve or Verbindungskurve Nantenbach) is the name of a connecting curve between the Main-Spessart Railway and the Hanover–Würzburg high-speed line. Coming from Aschaffenburg the line branches off towards Würzburg, about five kilometres (three miles) northeast of Lohr, in the cadastral district of Nantenbach, in the community of Neuendorf. From the Main-Spessart line, the railway turns in a wide curve to the southeast to a junction at the Rohrbach operating station on the Hanover–Würzburg line.

== Route ==
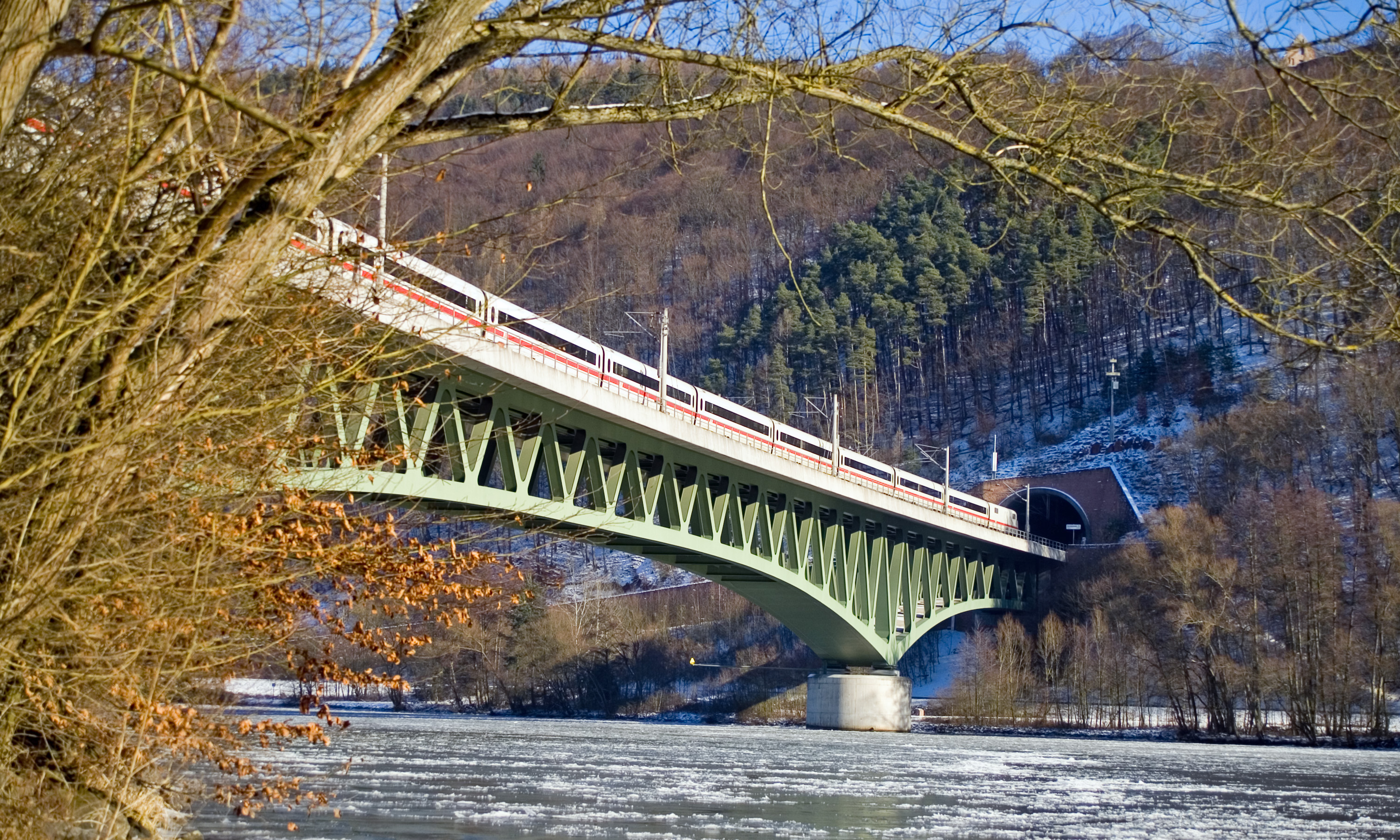
Main Viaduct and western entrance to the Schönrain Tunnel

The route is 11.3 kilometres (7.0 mi) long with continuous double track, electrified, equipped with the German Linienzugbeeinflussung train protection system, and running on many engineering structures: the 694.5-metre-long (759.5-yard) viaduct over the Main, followed by the 3,941-metre (2.449-mile) Schönrain Tunnel (passing under the 5,528 metres (3.435 mi) Muhlberg Tunnel on the Hanover–Würzburg line) and another three tunnels. About 60 percent of the curve – 6,449 metres (7,053 yards) – is four tunnels with lengths between 526 and 3,941 m (575 and 4,310 yd). The track rises 127 metres (417 ft) from the Nantenbach junction at 156 m (512 ft) above sea level to Rohrbach operating station at 283 m (928 ft) above sea level on a consistent grade of 1.25%. The minimum curve radius of 2,650 m (132 ch) allows a speed of 200 km/h (120 mph). A total of 740 m (810 yd) of the line is on bridges. The track is located for its full length in the Main-Spessart Nature Park. The line is largely slab track on an asphalt base.

The curve is used by about 60 freight and passenger trains each day.

== History ==
Planning for the line started in 1975 and planning approval was given in 1988. Construction started in March 1990 and the line was put into operation in June 1994.
