= Landrücken Tunnel =

Railway tunnel in Hesse

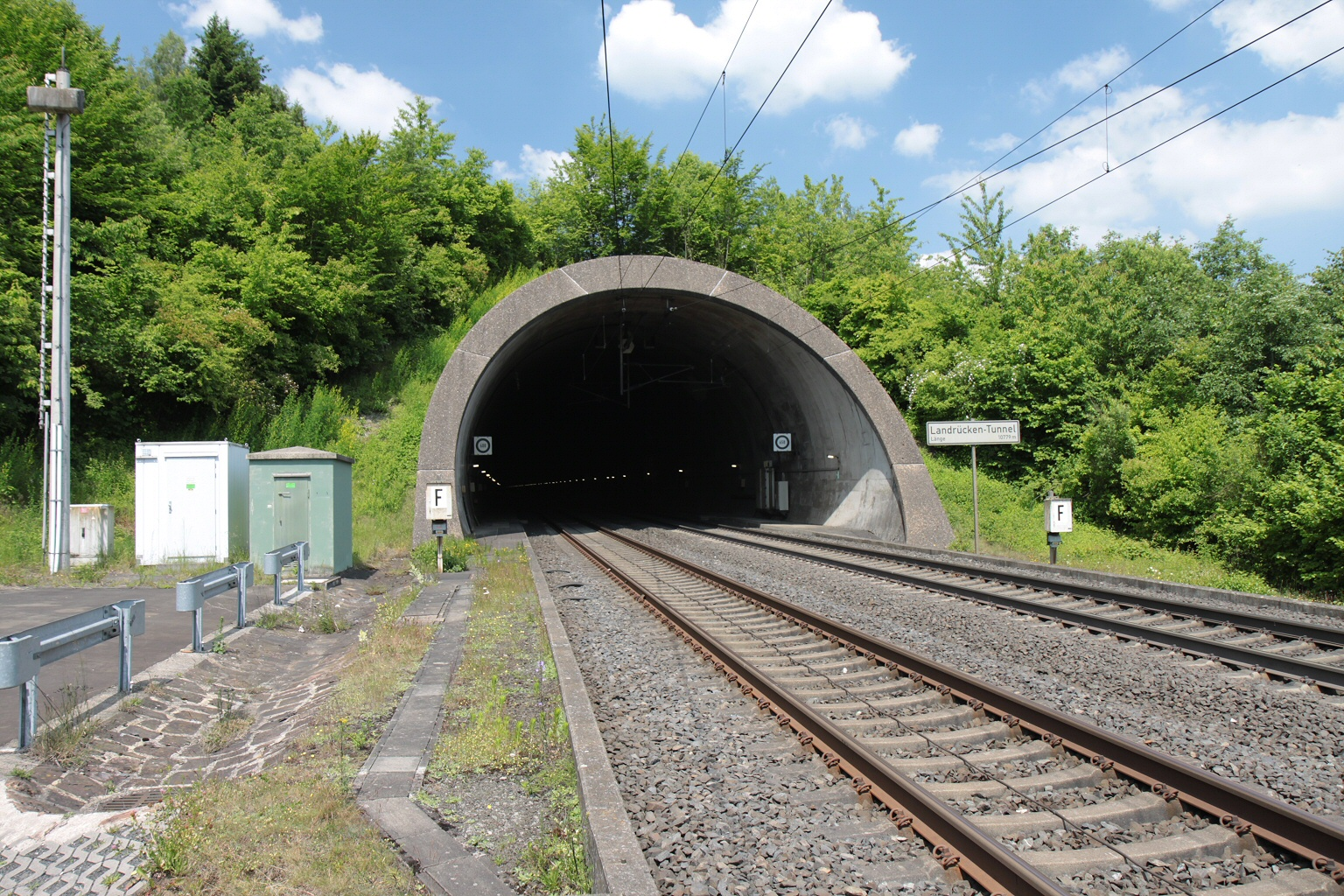
- South portal of the tunnel

Overview
- Line: Hanover–Würzburg high-speed line
- Coordinates: 50.406111°N 9.650833°E (north portal): 50.309722°N 9.663056°E (south portal)
- Crosses: Hessian Ridge

Operation
- Work began: 28 September 1981
- Constructed: 1986
- Opened: May 1988
- Operator: DB InfraGO
- Character: Single tube

Technical
- Length: 10,779 m (35,364 ft)
- No. of tracks: 2
- Track gauge: 1,435 mm (4 ft 8 1/2 in) standard gauge
- Electrified: 15 kV 16.7 Hz AC
- Operating speed: 250 km/h
- Tunnel clearance: 7.78 to 8.52 m
- Width: Up to 13.44 m

Route map
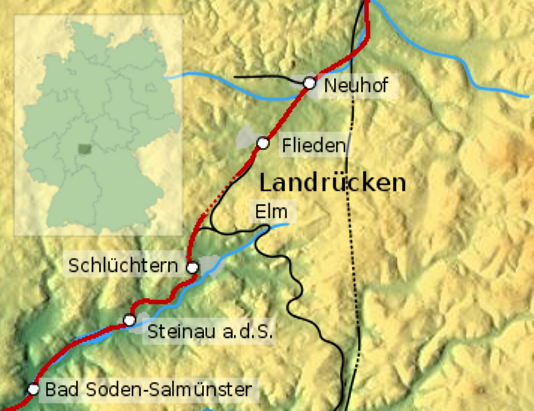
- Railway tunnels in the German mountain range Landrücken

The Landrücken Tunnel is a railway tunnel on the Hanover-Würzburg high-speed rail line. With a length of 10,779 metres (6.698 mi) it is the longest tunnel in Germany.

== Geography ==
The tunnel is in east Hessen between the stations of Fulda and Würzburg. Between the northern tunnel entrance of Kalbach (50° 24′ 22″N, 9° 39′3″E) and the southern end at Mottgers (50° 18′35″N, 9° 39′47″E) it crosses the Landrücken range which forms the Rhein-Weser drainage divide dividing the river basins of the Fulda and Main.

== Description of tunnel ==
The double-track Landrücken Tunnel was built using the New Austrian Tunnelling method working from the north portal, known as "Baulos Nord" and two side accesses ("Baulos Mitte" and "Baulos Süd"). In addition, three shafts were established for ventilation during tunnel boring.

The tunnel opened in 1988 with a total tunnel cross section of 100 to 110 square metres (1,100 to 1,200 sq ft) and a maximum 1.25% gradient. It surpassed the Kaiser-Wilhelm-Tunnel near Cochem as the longest railway tunnel in Germany.

Outside the north portal of the tunnel, at 380m altitude is the summit of the Hanover-Würzburg high-speed rail line.

== Technical data ==
- track separation: 4.70 m (15.4 ft)
- tunnel cross section area: 88 to 91 m^{2} (950 to 980 sq ft)
- steepest gradient: 1.25%
- equipment: Electrified, LZB signalling, "Zugfunk" radio, GSM-R, BOS-Funk, C-Netz (from 1992 to 2000), GSM900/1800 (T-mobile, Vodafone and Eplus since the middle of 2006), FM radio, wind direction measuring system, two emergency exits)

== Accidents ==
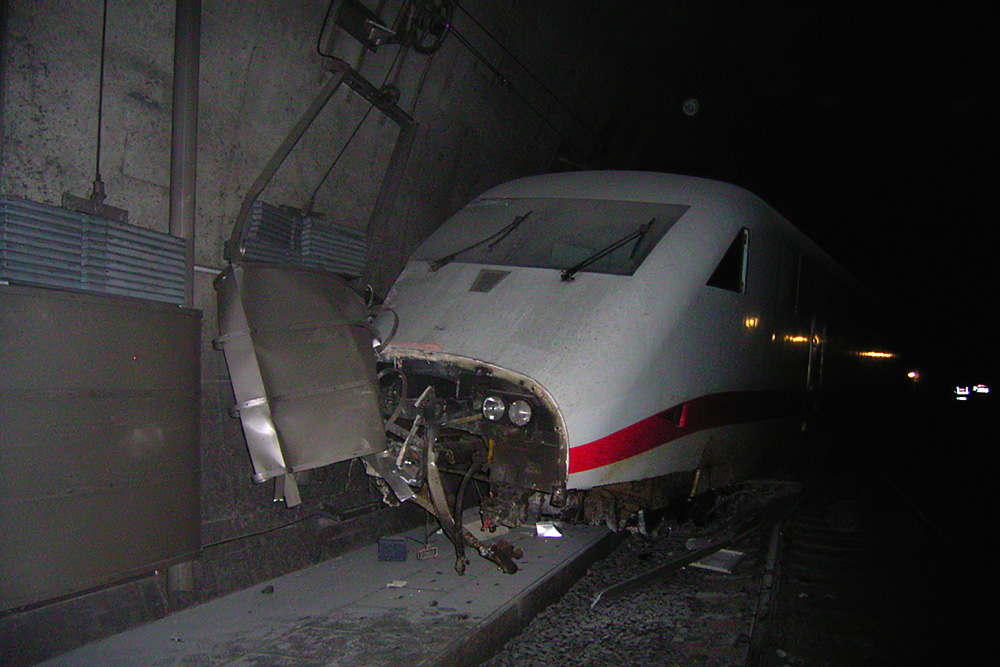
On 26 April 2008, the locomotive of an ICE 1 train collided with a flock of sheep, derailed and then came to a full stop at the walls of the tunnel

On April 26, 2008, ICE train 885 was on its way from Hamburg to Munich with 170 people on board. At 9:05pm, it collided with a herd of sheep that had strayed into the tunnel. The train derailed at 215 kilometres per hour (134 mph) inside the tunnel. 25 people were injured and 12 of the 14 cars were derailed.

== Distelrasen-Tunnel ==
A few kilometers west of the Landrücken Tunnel, the Distelrasen-Tunnel built in 1914, near Schlüchtern-Elm on the Kinzig Valley Railway, was the first railway to traverse the Landrücken drainage divide.
