= Hanau–Würzburg/Fulda–Erfurt high-speed railway =

High speed railway in Germany

The Hanau-Würzburg/Fulda-Erfurt high-speed railway is a collection of expansion projects on the Frankfurt–Göttingen railway improving capacity and journey times from Frankfurt-am-Main via Hanau to the north and east of Germany.

Its parts are as follows:

- expansion and new construction between Hanau and Nantenbach („Südkorridor“); completed
- four-track expansion of the existing Kinzig Valley Railway from Hanau to Gelnhausen; preparations underway, construction to start in 2025
- new high-speed line from Gelnhausen to Fulda; corridor selected and to be approved (Raumordungsverfahren)
- expansion and new construction from Fulda to Gerstungen
- the already completed expansion of the Thüringer Bahn between Gerstungen, Eisenach and Erfurt, which now allows speeds of 160 km/h, partially even 200 km/h.
