= Train categories in Europe =

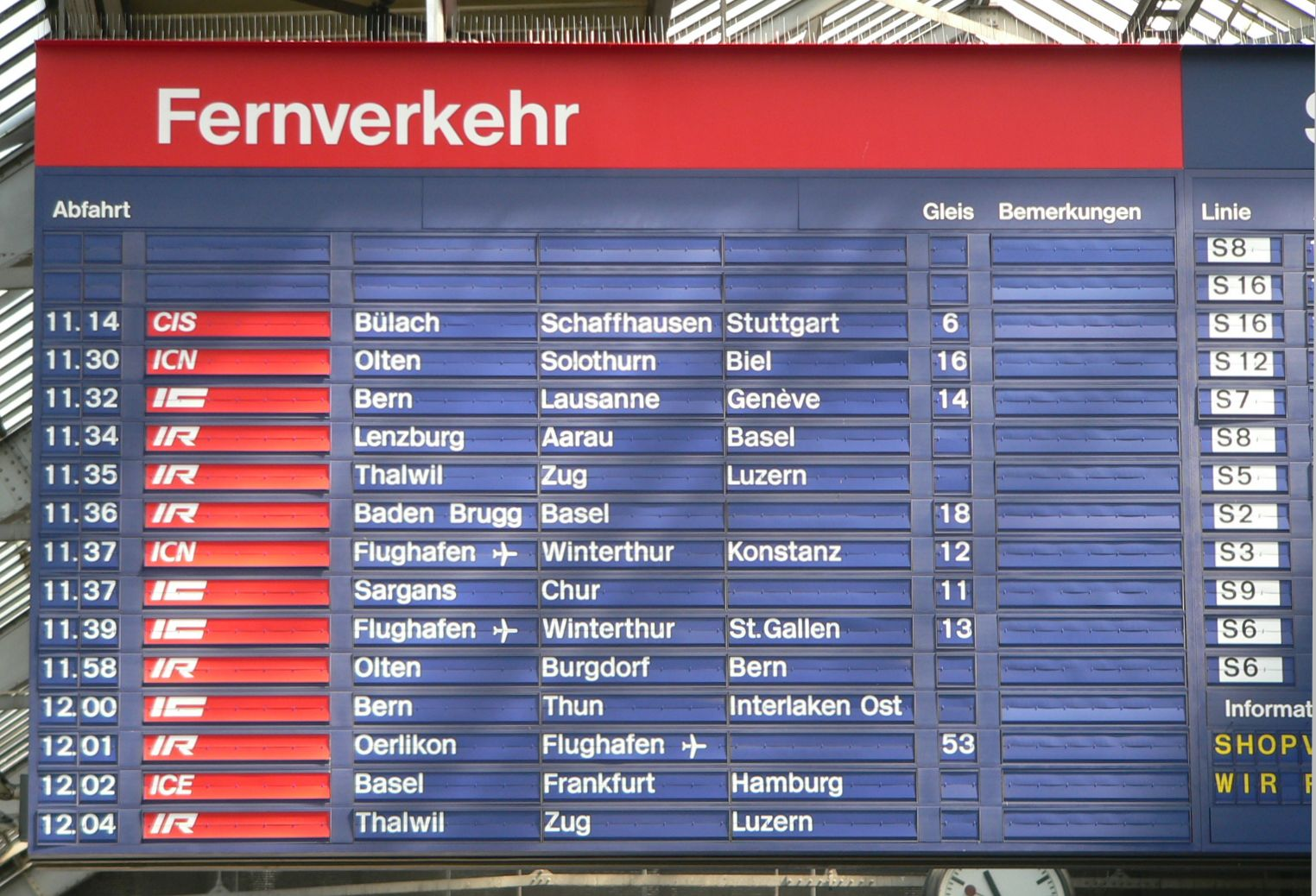
Sign panel displaying abbreviations of train categories

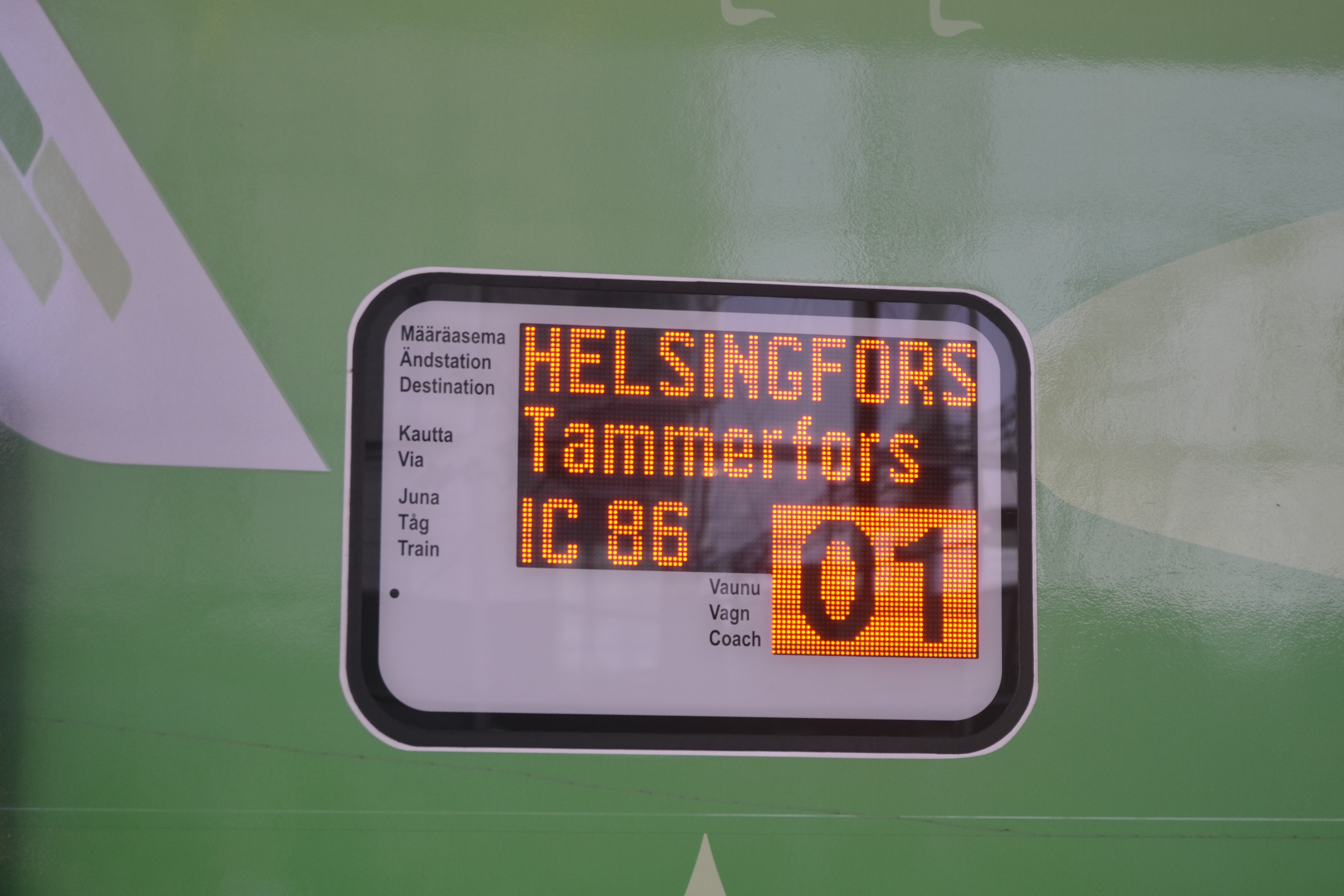
Information display indicating the train's category and number (IC 86)

In Europe, railway companies assign trains to different categories or train types depending on their role, i.e. based on the used rolling stock, their speed (high-speed, higher-speed, conventional), distance of travel (long, medium, short), stopping frequency (Inter-city, limited express, express, limited-stop, regional, commuter) and other criteria. Train categories/types often have specific abbreviations (e.g. IC). In addition, different lines or individual trains may be numbered. The abbreviations (and numbers) are usually indicated in timetables, passenger information systems and sometimes also on the destination sign of the train. Some services/trains are named. There is no common classification scheme throughout Europe; each country has its own, although categories of internationally operating trains are used across borders (e.g. EC).

A train type is not essentially a trademark name. However, there are trademark names that are also used as train types, such as the VogtlandExpress (VX) or the former CityNightLine (CNL) and Cisalpino (CIS).

This article lists European countries with their respective passenger train categories. Goods trains have their own train types and are not considered here. Passenger trains may be broadly split into long-distance and local trains; the latter having average journey times of under an hour and a range of less than 50 kilometres (31 mi). Often, long-distance trains require different tickets and/or seat reservation.

International trains are commonly classified as EuroCity (EC), while domestic Inter-city rail services frequently run as InterCity (IC). Most night trains operate under the EuroNight (EN) or Nightjet (NJ) category.

Exceptionally, trains are neither publicly classified nor numberered in the United Kingdom, but rather the brand of the operating company is used. In Russia, trains are only numbered and the number's digits defines the train's category.

== European long-distance and high-speed rail brands ==
| Name | Abbreviation | Service | Region |
|---|---|---|---|
| Alvia | | High-speed rail | Spain |
| Alfa Pendular | AP | High-speed rail | Portugal |
| Alta Velocidad Española | AVE | High-speed rail | Spain |
| Avant | | High-speed rail | Spain |
| Avlo | | High-speed rail | Spain |
| Asimenio Velos | | High-speed rail | Greece |
| CrossCountry | XC | High-speed rail | United Kingdom |
| EuroCity | EC | Long-distance train | Various European countries |
| EuroCity-Express | ECE | Long-distance train | Germany–Italy–Switzerland (Only called ECE in Germany, EC in Italy and Switzerland) |
| Euromed | | High-speed rail | Spain |
| EuroNight | EN | Long-distance night train | Various European countries |
| Eurostar | EST | High-speed rail | United Kingdom–France, United Kingdom–Belgium–The Netherlands, France–Belgium–Germany, France-Belgium-The Netherlands |
| Express InterCity Premium | EIP | High-speed rail | Poland |
| Frecce | FR, FA, FB | High-speed rail | Italy, Italy–France |
| Italo | NTV | High-speed rail | Italy |
| Intercity Direct | ICD | High-speed rail | Netherlands, Netherlands–Belgium |
| Intercity-Express | ICE | High-speed rail | Germany, Austria, Germany–Netherlands, Germany–Switzerland, Germany–Austria, Germany–France, Germany–Denmark, Germany–Belgium |
| InterCity Great Western, InterCity East Coast, InterCity West Coast | GW, GR, VT | High-speed rail | United Kingdom |
| Nightjet | NJ | Long-distance night train | Various European countries |
| Railjet | RJ | High-speed rail | Austria, Austria–Hungary, Austria–Germany, Austria–Switzerland, Austria–Czech Republic, Czech Republic, Czech Republic–Germany, Czech Republic–Germany–Denmark |
| Railjet xpress | RJX | High-speed rail | Austria, Austria–Switzerland, Austria–Slovakia |
| Southeastern Highspeed | SC | High-speed rail | United Kingdom |
| Train à Grande Vitesse | TGV | High-speed rail | France, France–Switzerland, France–Germany, France–Italy, France–Luxembourg, France–Belgium, France–Spain |
| Venice Simplon-Orient-Express | VSOE | Luxury train | Different routes |
| X 2000 | X2 | High-speed rail | Sweden, Sweden–Denmark |

=== Former ===
| Name | Abbreviation | Service | Region | Operation |
|---|---|---|---|---|
| Allegro | AE | High-speed rail | Finland, Russia | 2010–2022 |
| Cisalpino | CIS | High-speed rail | Italy, Germany, Switzerland | 1993–2009 |
| CityNightLine | CNL | Overnight train | Belgium, France, Italy, Switzerland and the Czech Republic | 1995–2016 |
| Intercity Tilting Train | ICN | High-speed tilting train, runs under the IC category since 2018 | Switzerland | 2000–2017 |
| Orient Express | | Luxury train | Different routes (Paris–Istanbul) | 1883–2009 |
| Trans Europ Express | TEE | Express train | Mainly western Europe | 1957–1995 |
| Trenhotel | TH | Long-distance train | Spain, Spain–Portugal, Spain–France, Spain–Switzerland, Spain–Italy | 1991–2020 |

== Austria ==
The table below summarizes train categories in Austria:

| Name | Abbreviation | Role |
|---|---|---|
| Railjet & Railjet Express | RJ & RJX | Long-distance (Fernverkehr), high-speed rail services, national and international to Germany, Czech Republic, Hungary, Italy, Slovakia and Switzerland. Uses push-pull train sets. |
| Intercity-Express | ICE | Long-distance (Fernverkehr), high-speed rail service to Germany. |
| Eurocity | EC | Long-distance (Fernverkehr) to international destinations. |
| Intercity | IC | Long-distance (Fernverkehr) |
| D-Zug | D | Long-distance (Fernverkehr) |
| Nightjet | NJ | Long-distance (Fernverkehr), mainly international overnight passenger train services. |
| Euronight | EN | Long-distance (Fernverkehr), mainly international overnight passenger train services. |
| Interregio | IR | Long-distance (Fernverkehr) that also stops at smaller stations. |
| Cityjet Express | CJX# | Local train (Nahverkehr) that stops only at larger stations. Lines are numbered. |
| Regional-Express | REX | Local train (Nahverkehr) that stops only at larger stations, but at more than CJX. Some lines are numbered. |
| Regionalzug | R | Regional train services (Nahverkehr) that usually stops at all stations. |
| S-Bahn | S# | Local train in urban, suburban and regional transport (Nahverkehr). S-Bahn networks exist in Carinthia, Salzburg, Styria, Tyrol, Upper Austria, Vorarlberg, and Vienna. Lines are numbered. |
| U-Bahn | U# | Rapid transit in Vienna. A small underground funicular is present in the car-free Tyrolean town of Serfaus. Lines are numbered. |

There are also international Long-distance (Fernverkehr) services in cooperation with international federal operators.

=== Private operators ===
| Name | Abbreviation | Role |
|---|---|---|
| Westbahn | WB | Long-distance (Fernverkehr) between Vienna and Salzburg, some trains continue to Munich (- Stuttgart) / Innsbruck (- Lindau) / Saalfelden (from 14 December 2025) |

== Belgium ==
In Belgium, the following train categories exist:

| Name | Abbreviation | Role |
|---|---|---|
| Eurostar and usually accept the same tickets | EUR | High-speed trains to Germany, France, the Netherlands and the United Kingdom (operated by SNCF, SNCB/NMBS and Eurostar UK Ltd.). |
| EuroCity | EC | International train meeting certain quality criteria. |
| Train à grande vitesse | TGV | High-speed trains to France (operated by SNCF). |
| Intercity Express | ICE | High-speed trains to Germany (operated by DB) |
| International train | INT | Regular international train. |
| InterCity | IC | A train connecting Belgium's major cities. These trains stop at the most important stations only, sometimes crossing national borders as well. |
| Rush-hour train | P | Additional scheduled train service that is limited to times at which the demand for a certain route is at its highest. The number of stops varies between trains. |
| Local train | L | Local trains usually connect larger cities, but will stop at (nearly) every station along the way. Similar to German Regionalbahn. |
| S-trains | S# | Suburban train connecting towns and cities around Belgium's major cities of Antwerp, Brussels, Charleroi, Ghent and Liege. Stops at (nearly) every station. Each line will have a number (S1–S20 + S81 for Brussels, S1 + S32–S34 for Antwerp, S41–S44 for Liege, S51–S53 for Ghent, and S61–S64 for Charleroi). |
| Tourist train | T | Additional scheduled train service that is limited to times at which the demand for a certain touristic destination is at its highest. The number of stops varies between trains. |
| Extra train | EXT | Additional train service, used in case of exceptionally good weather to accommodate more passengers on routes to the coast or in case of special events such as concerts. |
| European Sleeper | | Couchette train to the Netherlands, Germany and the Czech Republic. |

== Bulgaria ==
Train categories in Bulgaria use the simplified model of the previous century. At the beginning of rail transport in Bulgaria there were only three categories of passenger trains: Бърз пътнически влак (БПВ) – Barz patnicheski vlak (Fast passenger train), the equivalent of the current Fast train; Обикновен пътнически влак (ОПВ) – Obiknoven patnicheski vlak (Regular passenger train), the equivalent of the current Passenger train and Смесен пътнически влак (СПВ) – Smesen patnicheski vlak, the equivalent of Mixed train. Using this basis BDŽ now provides extended variety of these simple categories.

ЕВ – Експресен влак [Ekspresen vlak] – Express train
EV – Trains for medium and long distances, which stop only at the most major stations (in big cities or for a train connection). They provide higher comfort in the carriages and usually have catering and/or restaurant car. All the express trains used to have names (e.g. "Plovdiv Express", "Yantra Express", "Chaika Express", "Express Slanchev Bryag", "Diana Express" etc.) and sometimes unique livery, different from the other trains. There were also first-class-only trains (Express 100/101 "Plovdiv"). Because of an introduced regulation the average speed of the express trains to be at least 100 km/h, all the express trains became BVZR trains. Tariff: same as BVZR.
Reservation: obligatory. Coaches: 1st class, 2nd class, restaurant car (or catering), sometimes luggage and/or mail car. Four of the express trains ("Shipka" and "Sinite kamani") used DMUs.
Currently not in service.
УБВ – Ускорен бърз влак [Uskoren barz vlak] – literally "Accelerated fast train"
UBV – Trains for long distances, which stop only at one or two major stations in-between. They ran seasonally only between the capital and the seaside on Fridays and Sundays. For a short period of time this category was used as a synonym of BVZR trains. Tariff: same as BVZR.
Reservation: obligatory. Coaches: 1st class, 2nd class, bistro car.
Currently not in service.
БВЗР – Бърз влак със задължителна резервация [Barz vlak sas zadalzhitelna rezervatsia] – Fast train with obligatory reservation (also seen as R-БВ or БВ-R)
BVZR – Trains for medium and long distances, which stop only at major stations. Usually former Express trains. Their average speed is not more than 100 km/h. Some of these also have names, but with the word "express" removed. Tariff: The tariff for BVZR is the most expensive in Bulgaria. The price for 100 km in 2nd class is 8,70 BGN (4,45 EUR) and 10,90 BGN (5,57 EUR) in 1st class. Reservation costs 0,50 BGN (0,26 EUR). Some trains could be more expensive on partisular dates.
Reservation: obligatory. Coaches: 1st class, 2nd class; in the past: restaurant or buffet car (or catering), sometimes luggage and/or mail car.
МБВ – Международен бърз влак [Mezhdunaroden barz vlak] – International fast train
MBV – International trains have different terms of service. There are regular, seasonal and extra MBV trains as well as trains for only international journeys and ones that could be used as regular BV trains in the country.
Tariff: Internal: same as BV; international: according to the contracts with the other countries.
Reservation: Internal: optional; international: obligatory. Coaches: international cars + cars for internal journeys (2nd class, sometimes 1st class, in the past: luggage and/or mail car). DMUs are also used between Bulgaria and Romania.
БВ – Бърз влак [Barz vlak] – Fast train
BV – Trains for medium and long distances, which stop only at major stations but more than express trains.
Tariff: According to the tariff for BV the price for 100 km in 2nd class is 5.90 BGN (3.02 EUR) and 7.40 BGN (3.78 EUR) in 1st class. Reservation costs 0.50 BGN (0.26 EUR). Some trains could be more expensive on partisular dates.
Reservation: optional. Coaches: 1st class, 2nd class; sleepers and couchette cars during the night; in the past: sometimes restaurant or buffet car, luggage and/or mail car. Sometimes EMUs or DMUs are also used.
ПВ – Пътнически влак [Patnicheski vlak] – Passenger train
PV – Trains for distances, longer than 100 km, which stop at every station.
Tariff: According to the tariff for PV the price for 100 km in 2nd class is 5.20 BGN (2.66 EUR) and 6.50 BGN (3.32 EUR) in 1st class. Currently 1st class is not available on passenger trains. Some trains could be more expensive on partisular dates.
Reservation: not available. Coaches: 2nd class; in the past: sometimes luggage and/or mail car; in case of first-class cars coupled, the taxes are the same as second-class ones. Frequently operated by EMUs or DMUs.
КПВ – Крайградски пътнически влак [Kraigradski patnicheski vlak] – Local passenger train
KPV – Trains for distances, shorter than 100 km, which stop at every station. Frequently operated by EMUs or DMUs. Tariff: same as PV.
Reservation: not available. Coaches: 2nd class; in the past: sometimes luggage and/or mail car; in case of first-class cars coupled, the taxes are the same as second-class ones.
СВ – Смесен влак [Smesen vlak] – Mixed train
SV – Trains for short and medium distances with both passenger and freight carriages. They stop at every station and usually it is for a long time, because of the cargo services. Tariff: same as PV.
Reservation: not available. Coaches: same as PV + freight waggons.
Currently not in service.

== Croatia ==
There are several different ranks of passenger trains operating inside Croatia by HŽ Putnički prijevoz.

Since a large number of fast, semi fast, regional and local trains have commuter-oriented schedules, they often offer passengers daily migration to the large city areas from more distant towns and settlements – between 50 and 100 km (31 and 62 mi) – and vice versa. This can, for example, refer to the railway connection of the Central Croatia's wider region with Zagreb metropolitan area.

| Name | Abbreviation | Role |
|---|---|---|
| EuroCity | EC | International train between Zagreb main station and Wien Hbf or Frankfurt (Main) Hbf (via Maribor, Villach Hbf). |
| EuroNight | EN | International night trains to Stuttgart Hbf and Zürich HB. |
| InterCity | IC | These trains are rare in Croatia. They operate on long national and international routes and usually serve only the largest stations along the way. Currently, the only InterCity services in Croatia are Zagreb – Budapest and Zagreb – Osijek. |
| InterCity nagibni | ICN | Tilting train services connecting Zagreb with Split during the day, also serving decent amount of larger stations along their route. Thanks to this technology, they can run faster than conventional trains. Contrary to regular overnight fast trains between Zagreb and Split with scheduled travelling time of circa 8 hours in total, tilting trains on the Zagreb–Split route (lines M202 and M604) offer passengers journeys with a riding times of about 6 hours. |
| Brzi | B | Fast trains operating on medium to long distances, serving only stations in larger settlements along the track. Their purpose is very similar to InterCity trains. |
| Ubrzani | | Ubrzani (lit. 'accelerated') trains operate on medium to long distances and their purpose is to serve destinations which have justified number of passengers. Functionally, they are similar and use the same rolling stock as the slower passenger trains, but they skip certain smaller stations. |
| Putnički | | Putnički (lit. 'passenger') trains cover short, medium and long distances and generally serve all stations along their route, representing the largest part of passenger trains on the nationwide level. They are mainly used by local residents traveling between smaller settlements and larger centres/railway hubs or by those who want to continue their journey further using mostly well-adjusted transfers – in both cases for daily migrations (school, work, hospital, shopping, etc.) or other reasons. These trains usually have daily frequencies that meet the needs of the local population. |
| Prigradski | | Prigradski (lit. 'suburban') trains operate exclusively on the Zagreb Commuter Rail corridor and have the most frequent daily schedules of all types of train lines in Croatia. They are run by light motor sets that can be started and stopped quickly, and like the most of regional/local trains, they serve every station along their way. On the train lines operating within suburban areas of other larger towns, certain number of regional/local trains play the role of suburban trains. |

== Czech Republic ==
The following train categories are present in the Czech Republic:

| Name | Abbreviation | Role |
|---|---|---|
| SuperCity | SC | Highest-standard trains requiring reservation, made of modern tilting train units operating on national and international routes. Stopping at region capitals only. As of February 2025, the SC 240/241 "Košičan" is not operated by Pendolino trains, but with classic EuroCity train. But SuperCity service has been added to Opava. Some trains are replaced by classic-built sets due to the lack operational, Pendolino trains and are operated in the IC "Ostravan" category, but are not part of any other long-distance line. (No. 500 - 519) Praha hl.n. – Praha Libeň -Pardubice hl.n. – Olomouc hl.n. – Ostrava-Svinov – (Opava východ)/ Ostrava hl.n. – Bohumín |
| Railjet | rj | Highest-standard trains, operating on international routes: from 2014: (Berlin – Dresden – Ústí Nad Labem –) Prague – Pardubice – Brno – Vienna – Graz; from 2026: (Copenhagen – Odense –) Hamburg – Berlin – Dresden – Ústí Nad Labem – Prague. |
| EuroCity | EC | Higher-standard international trains, consisting of new or modernised cars of several rail companies and stopping at selected stations only. |
| EuroNight | EN | International sleeper trains. |
| European Sleeper | ES | Sleeper trains to Germany, the Netherlands and Belgium. |
| InterCity | IC | The highest category of national trains, with carriages and stopping frequencies comparable to the EC trains. |
| Express | Ex (IC) | Faster trains linking regions, mostly faster and more comfortable than the R trains. Operate on Ex lines. |
| Rychlík (lit. 'Fast-Train') | R | The lowest category of longer-distance train. Operates on R lines. They are mainly used for getting between districts of region, cities and transport hubs. |
| Spěšný vlak (lit. 'Regional Fast Train') | Sp | Local medium distance trains stopping less often than Os but more than R at selected stations, mostly larger municipalities and cities. Operates on S lines. |
| Osobní vlak (lit. 'Commuter Train') | Os | Local trains stopping at every or almost every station. It is often centered around a larger city (often capital of a region/district). Operates on S lines. |

=== Private operators ===
| Name | Abbreviation | Role |
|---|---|---|
| Leo Express | LE | Private trains of IC category |
| Regiojet | RJ | Private trains of IC category |

== Denmark ==
In Denmark, the following train categories are used:

| Operator | Name | Abbreviation | Role | Typical maximum speed | Rolling stock |
|---|---|---|---|---|---|
| Danish State Railways | InterCityLyn+ (InterCityLightning+) | ICL+ or IL | Long-distance, with few or no intermediate stops | 180 km/h (110 mph) | Class ER (IR4) EMUs; Class MF (IC3) DMUs; Class MG (IC4) DMUs |
| Danish State Railways | InterCityLyn (InterCityLightning) | ICL | Long-distance, with fewer stops than InterCity | 180 km/h (110 mph) | Class ER (IR4) EMUs; Class MF (IC3) DMUs; Class MG (IC4) DMUs |
| Danish State Railways | InterCity | IC | Long-distance | 180 km/h (110 mph) | Class ER (IR4) EMUs; Class MF (IC3) DMUs; Class MG (IC4) DMUs |
| Danish State Railways | Regionaltog | Re | Regional trains | 160–180 km/h (99–112 mph) | Class EB (Siemens Vectron) electric locomotives Class ME diesel-electric locomotives Class BK/B/ABS (Bombardier TWINDEXX Vario) double-decker cars Class ER (IR4) EMUs; Class MG (IC4) DMUs |
| Danish State Railways | Københavns S-tog (Copenhagen S-trains) | S | Local/suburban/commuter trains in Copenhagen (S-Bahn) | 120 km/h (75 mph) | Class SA/SE (4th gen S-trains) EMUs |
| České Dráhy (Czech State Railways) | Railjet | RJ | Long-distance trains on the Copenhagen-Hamburg-Berlin-Dresden-Prague line | 180 km/h (110 mph) (230 km/h (140 mph) in Germany; 160 km/h (99 mph) in the Czech Republic) | Siemens Viaggio Comfort push-pulls |
| VR Sverige under contract from Skånetrafiken | Øresundståg (Øresund trains) | Re/Ø | Trains to and from Scania in Sweden, running as regional trains in Denmark | 180 km/h (110 mph) | Class ET (X31K in Sweden) (Øresundståg/OTU) EMUs |
| Arriva | Regionaltog | RX | Regional trains in Jutland | 120 km/h (75 mph) | Alstom LINT 41 DMUs; Siemens Desiro DMUs |
| Arriva | Regionaltog | RA | Regional trains in Jutland | 120 km/h (75 mph) | Alstom LINT 41 DMUs; Siemens Desiro DMUs |
| Arriva | Vestbanen/Lokalbane 84 (Western railway/Local rail 84) | L | Local trains in South Jutland | 120 km/h (75 mph) | Alstom LINT 41 DMUs |
| Nordjyske Jernbaner (North Jutland Railways) | Regionaltog | Re | Regional trains in North Jutland | 140 km/h (87 mph); 120 km/h (75 mph) | Alstom LINT 41 DMUs; Siemens Desiro DMUs |
| Nordjyske Jernbaner (North Jutland Railways) | Lokaltog | L | Local trains in North Jutland | 140 km/h (87 mph); 120 km/h (75 mph) | Alstom LINT 41 DMUs; Siemens Desiro DMUs |
| Midtjyske Jernbaner (Central Jutland Railways) | Lokaltog | L | Local trains in Central Jutland | ? 120 km/h (75 mph) | Y-tog (Y-trains) DMUs? Siemens Desiro DMUs |
| Lokaltog | Lokaltog | L | Local trains on Zealand and Lolland | 120 km/h (75 mph); 140 km/h (87 mph); 120 km/h (75 mph) | Alstom LINT 41 DMUs; IC2 DMUs; Siemens RegioSprinter DMUs |

Light rail

| Name | Abbreviation | Role | Typical maximum speed | Rolling stock |
|---|---|---|---|---|
| Aarhus Letbane (Aarhus Light Rail) | L1; L2 | Light rail in Aarhus | 100 km/h (62 mph); 80 km/h (50 mph) | Stadler Tango EMUs; Stadler Variobahn EMUs |
| Odense Letbane (Odense Light Rail) | | Light rail in Odense (since 2022) | 60–80 km/h (37–50 mph) | Stadler Variobahn EMUs |
| Greater Copenhagen Light Rail | | Upcoming light rail in Copenhagen (2025) | 70–80 km/h (43–50 mph) | Siemens Avenio EMUs |

Metro

| Name | Abbreviation | Role | Typical maximum speed | Rolling stock |
|---|---|---|---|---|
| Københavns Metro (Copenhagen Metro) | M1/M2 M3/M4 | Metro in Copenhagen | 80 km/h (50 mph) 90 km/h (56 mph) | 1st gen Hitachi Rail Italy (formerly AnsaldoBreda) Driverless Metro EMUs 5th gen Hitachi Rail Italy (formerly AnsaldoBreda) Driverless Metro EMUs |

== Finland ==
The list below includes train categories in Finland:

| Name | Abbreviation | Role | Typical route length / stopping interval | Typical maximum speed | Onboard services | Rolling stock |
|---|---|---|---|---|---|---|
| Allegro | AE | International high-speed train between Helsinki and Saint Petersburg, Russia (discontinued in 2022). | 400 km (250 mi) / 100 km (62 mi) | 220 km/h (140 mph) | 1st class, 2nd class, restaurant car | KT Class Sm6 tilting electric trainsets |
| Pendolino | S | High-speed train between major hub stations. Some trains stop more frequently, similar to the InterCity trains (see below). | 200–700 km (120–430 mi) / 50–200 km (31–124 mi) | 200–220 km/h (120–140 mph) | Business class, 2nd class, restaurant car | VR Class Sm3 electric trainsets VR Class Sm6 electric trainsets |
| InterCity | IC | The backbone of Finnish long-distance trains, mainly serving trunk lines radiating from Helsinki and stopping at major stations. | 200–900 km (120–560 mi) / 50–100 km (31–62 mi) | 140–200 km/h (87–124 mph) | Business class, 2nd class, restaurant car or a sales trolley | Locomotive hauled, mostly double-deck cars (manufactured since the 1990s) most trains with push-pull operation |
| Nighttime Express | PYO | Nighttime sleeper trains between Helsinki and Finnish Lapland and international sleeper train "Tolstoy" (discontinued) between Moscow, Russia and Helsinki. | 1,000 km (620 mi) / 50–200 km (31–124 mi) | 120–140 km/h (75–87 mph) | Business class/First class, 2nd class, restaurant car, sleeping berths, car-carrier wagons | Locomotive hauled, mixture of older and newer Finnish cars (Lapland trains), Russian cars (Moscow train) |
| Regional | H | Trains on electrified routes with relatively few passengers, trains stopping at every station. | 200 km (120 mi) / 10–50 km (6.2–31.1 mi) | 120 km/h (75 mph) | 2nd class | Locomotive hauled, old commuter cars |
| Regional | HDM | Trains on unelectrified routes with relatively few passengers, trains stopping at every station. | 200 km (120 mi) / 10–50 km (6.2–31.1 mi) | 100–120 km/h (62–75 mph) | 2nd class | VR Class Dm12 diesel railcars |
| Commuter | Route letters (see note below) | Commuter trains in Helsinki region. Some trains stop only at the largest suburban stations, but others stop at every station similar to the German S-Bahn trains. | 20–100 km (12–62 mi) / 2–10 km (1.2–6.2 mi) | 120–160 km/h (75–99 mph) | 2nd class | Electric multiple units (VR Class Sm2, Sm4, Sm5) |

NOTE: Long-distance trains are identified (in passenger information systems) by train number prefixed with the train type abbreviation (e.g. "IC 90"). However, the Helsinki region commuter trains are identified by their "route letters" only (e.g. "K") and usually do not show their train number to passengers at all.

== France ==
The national carrier of France, the SNCF, uses a different system of train categories, based on politics wishes and commercial trademarks. The categories do not necessarily match with distance.

| Name | Abbreviation | Role |
|---|---|---|
| Frecciarossa | | High-speed trains between France and Italy operated by Trenitalia France, previously named Thello (a then newly created society owned by Transdev and the FS after breaking an alliance between the SNCF and the FS). |
| Train à Grande Vitesse | TGV | National or international services by high-speed trains with supplementary fare, totally or partially on high-speed lines. Similar to Germany's ICE. |
| Train à Grande Vitesse | TGV ı̣nOui | Premium national TGV services. |
| Train à Grande Vitesse | TGV Lyria | TGV service between France and Switzerland. |
| Train à Grande Vitesse | Ouigo | Low-cost high-speed (and conventional) train services of SNCF in cooperation with NMBS/SNCB operating in France and Belgium. |
| Intercités | IC | National InterCity services, ever on main lines and/or secondary lines without supplementary fare. Similar to the InterRegio or the Intercity (Paris – Caen – Cherbourg and Paris – Rouen – Le Havre). Used to be called Train Inter Regional, but this name has become obsolete. |
| Intercités de Nuit | | Night service on national routes. |
| Transport express régional | TER | These trains are subsidized by regions and do not designate a precise category: a TER route can be anything from 15 km (9.3 mi) to more than 400 km (250 mi) long. Some TER routes are longer than TGV ones. Regional or national services, on main lines or secondary lines without supplementary fare. Used to be similar to the S-Bahn (many stops from a major city on a short distance, urban or suburban service), the Regional or RegioExpress, but can be also similar to the InterRegio-Express or the InterRegio (Orléans – Lyon and Toulouse – Clermont-Ferrand). |
| Transport express régional | TERGV | Some special regional trains, called TERGV (TER and TGV), consist of TGV trains subsidized for regional service, though with a supplementary fare compared to the same trip using standard TER service. These trains use the high speed lines (LGV) to quickly link cities such as Dunkirk, Calais, and Boulogne-sur-Mer to Lille in an hour. Similar services in Europe include Southeastern's Highspeed service. |
| Transport express régional | TER^{200} | Accelerated TER between Bâle SNCF and Strasbourg. |
| Transport express régional | iC TER | |
| Transport express régional | Interloire | TER with Intercity-like stopping pattern on the Nantes – Orléans route. |
| Transilien | Route letter | Suburban railway in Île-de-France region, including Paris. Lines numbered H, J, K, L, N, P, R, U and V and operated by SNCF. |
| Réseau Express Régional (RER) | Route letter | A hybrid commuter rail and rapid transit system in the Île-de-France region, linking Paris with its suburbs. Lines numbered A–E. |
| Métro | M | Rapid transit systems in the cities of Lille, Lyon, Marseille, Paris, Rennes and Toulouse. Lines are usually numbered. |

== Germany ==
The following train categories exist in Germany:

| Name | Abbreviation | Role |
|---|---|---|
| Eurocity-Express | ECE | International high-speed, long-distance services on the Frankfurt – Milan and Munich – Zürich routes |
| Intercity-Express | ICE | National and international high-speed, long-distance services |
| InterCity | IC | National and some international long-distance services |
| EuroCity | EC | International long-distance services |
| EuroNight | EN | International night train services |
| D-Zug | D | Fast local services with few stops; only operating as part of the Sylt Shuttle plus |
| Interregio-Express | IRE | Fast local services over longer distances than usual Regional-Express trains |
| Regional-Express | RE | Fast local services with fewer stops |
| Flughafen-Express | FEX | Local services connecting airports with the city centre |
| Metropolexpress | MEX | Fast local services with fewer stops; only existing in Baden-Württemberg |
| Regionalbahn | RB | Local services, stopping at all stations except where there is a parallel S-Bahn service |
| S-Bahn | S | Suburban services in major cities, those in Berlin and Hamburg operating on separate networks |
| U-Bahn / Stadtbahn | U | Rapid transit in Berlin, Hamburg, Munich and Nuremberg and light rail in several other cities |

=== Private operators ===
| Name | Abbreviation | Role |
|---|---|---|
| alex | ALX | alex Interregio replacement IR 25 Munich–Oberstdorf–Lindau and Munich–Regensburg–Schwandorf–Hof (Saale)–Prague of the Länderbahn, equates to the InterRegio service, but may be used with local fares or Bayern and Schönes-Wochenende tickets (lit. 'nice weekend tickets') |
| FlixTrain | FLX | FlixBus runs two long-distance train services: Stuttgart – Berlin and Cologne – Hamburg |
| Harz-Berlin-Express | HBX | Veolia long-distance trains |
| InterConnex | X | Transdev Germany long-distance services, equating to the Interregio trains |
| Lausitz-Express | LX | Transdev Sachsen-Anhalt long-distance services |
| metronom regional | MEr | Metronom Eisenbahngesellschaft local passenger trains stopping at all stations |
| Mitfahrzug | | IGE long-distance services |
| Regiobahn | S 28 | Train type and route number of a private S-Bahn line of S-Bahn Rhein-Ruhr |
| Vogtland-Express | VX | Die Länderbahn long-distance trains |

There are further private operators, e.g. Stern & Hafferl that operate the same categories as the Federal Railways. Also, some international operators, e.g. RegioJet, run services to international destinations.

== Greece ==
There are three types of passenger rail services in Greece:

- InterCity (IC) between Thessaloniki, Athens and Kalambaka, with two-digit train numbers
- Express trains (Greek: Ταχεία), with three-digit train numbers
- "Regular" trains (Greek: Κοινή αμαξοστοιχία, lit. 'regular/common train'), with four-digit train numbers

In addition, suburban train networks are present in Athens (with lines numbered A1–A4), Patras (lines P1 and P2) and Thessaloniki (lines T1–T3).

A night train, named Hellas Express, links Thessaloniki with Belgrade (Serbia), via Skopje (North Macedonia).

== Hungary ==
In Hungary, there are the following train categories:

| Service | Name | Abbreviation | Role |
|---|---|---|---|
| Long-distance | EuroCity | EC | International trains, often Railjet. |
| Long-distance | InterCity | IC | Trains mainly in national services on important long-distance routes, often with air conditioning, restaurant car and always seat reservation. |
| Long-distance | Expressz | | Express train with compulsory seat reservation (only summertime). |
| Long-distance | Gyorsvonat | | Rapid trains on long-distance routes with standard rolling stock. |
| Long-distance | Sebesvonat | | Eilzug equivalent. |
| Long-distance | Interrégió | | InterRegio trains, which make connections with Intercity trains from smaller towns. Air conditioned, allowed to travel with bike or wheelchair. |
| Local | Zónázó | | Regionalbahn or "Regional-Express" equivalent |
| Local | Személyvonat | | Regionalzug equivalent. |
| Local | EURegio | | State-subsidiarised international stopping trains near the border with Austria, connects Győr to Vienna and Wiener Neustadt to Graz via Sopron, Szombathely and Jennersdorf. |
| Local | Regional-Express | REX | ÖBB trains serve the Vienna-Ebenfurth-Sopron-Deutschkreutz line |

== Ireland ==
Four different train categories are operated in the Republic of Ireland, by both Iarnród Éireann and NI Railways.

- D.A.R.T: Rapid transit train network in Dublin.
- Commuter: Suburban services operated around major cities in Ireland.
- Intercity: National long-distance or local services operated between cities.
- Enterprise: International long-distance service operated jointly by NI Railways and Iarnród Éireann between Dublin's Connolly station and Belfast Grand Central station in Northern Ireland (UK).

== Italy ==
Train categories without * are all operated by Trenitalia, Italy's primary rail carrier. Regional and local trains, which are financed by administrative regions, are also used by regional railways (generally isolated from the national railway network).

| Service | Name | Abbreviation | Role |
|---|---|---|---|
| International (mandatory reservation) | EuroCity | EC | Trains run by different operators to Austria/Germany (ÖBB), France (Thello) and Germany/Switzerland (jointly by Trenitalia and SBB CFF FFS). |
| International (mandatory reservation) | EuroNight | EN | Cross-border sleeper trains. |
| International (mandatory reservation) | Train à grande vitesse | TGV | Operated by SVI (Società Viaggiatori Italia, a company of SNCF). |
| National | Frecciarossa | FR | High-speed train (Le Frecce) with speeds up to 300 km/h (190 mph). Cross-border service to Paris is operated by Trenitalia France (formerly Thello) |
| National | Frecciargento | FA | High-speed train (Le Frecce) with speeds up to 250 km/h (160 mph). |
| National | .italo | * NTV | High-speed train with speeds up to 300 km/h (190 mph). |
| National | Frecciabianca | FB | High-speed trains (Le Frecce) running once every hour or two hours on the most important long-distance routes with speeds up to 200 km/h (120 mph). |
| National | InterCity | IC | Main line long-distance trains (replaced mostly by Frecciabianca as of 13 December 2008). |
| National | InterCity Notte | ICN | Sleeper train (long-distance). |
| National | Regionale Veloce (Regio Express) | RV (RE) | Local or interregional trains only stopping at a few selected stations. Includes also the Regio Express (RE) for the Merano-Malles line (South Tyrol), managed by * SAD, and for RE lines in Lombardy operated by * BLS and * TILO/Trenord. |
| National | Regionale | R | Basic local train, equates to the German Regionalbahn. |
| National | Suburbano | S | Suburban commuter services for the Milan suburban railway service (* Trenord) and S-Bahn services of * TILO crossing the border with Switzerland. |
| National | Metropolitano | | For Naples suburban service's line 2, and also trains between Cagliari and Decimomannu in Sardinia. |
| National | Diretto | D/DIR | Mostly abandoned category, but still used by Circumvesuviana (a group of narrow-gauge railways connecting towns to the south-east of Naples) and by Società Subalpina Imprese Ferroviarie for the cross-border Domodossola–Locarno railway.Trains operate within one or more contiguous regions. |
| National | Accelerato | A | Mostly abandoned category, but still used by Circumvesuviana. Stops at all stations. |
| National | Direttissimo | DD | Mostly abandoned category, but still used by Circumvesuviana. Characterized by only a few stops and high speed, but without the surcharge. |
| National | Express | EXP | Mostly abandoned category, still used by Circumvesuviana for the Campania Express. Characterized by limited stops. |

== Luxembourg ==
Because of its small size and its location, Luxembourg has more international trains than national ones.

Some trains are considered both Luxembourgish (by the CFL, according to their map) and from the border country the train is from or crossing (like L and P trains from Belgium, TER from France, RE from Germany), no matter if these trains are really from Luxembourg or not, making these trains more difficult to classify. These difficulties are due to the assimilation of each train as Regional-Express or InterRegio in Luxembourg (similar name in Germany and Belgium, specific name in France).

| Service | Name | Abbreviation | Role |
|---|---|---|---|
| International | EuroCity | EC | International trains connecting Belgium and Switzerland through Luxembourg and France (Brussels-South – Basel SBB/Chur/Zürich HB). |
| International | InterCity | IC | Long-distance trains from either Belgium (InterCity J: Brussels-South – Luxembourg) and Germany (Cologne – Luxembourg). |
| International | InterRegio | IR | Long-distance trains from Belgium (InterRegio m: Luxembourg – Liège/Lier). |
| International | Train à grande vitesse | TGV | High-speed train from France (Paris – Luxembourg). |
| International | Intercités de Nuit | | Night service from France (Nice – Luxembourg) and Spain (Portbou – Luxembourg). |
| International | TER Grand Est | | Regional train (TER) from Lorraine, France (Longuyon – Luxembourg; Longwy – Esch-sur-Alzette – Thionville; Nancy – Luxembourg, French extension to Épinal and Remiremont). |
| International | Regional-Express | RE | Regional train from Rhineland-Palatinate, Germany (Trier – Luxembourg, German extension to Wittlich and Cochern). |
| International | Piekuurtrein (Rush-hour train) | P | Regional trains from Belgium, circulating in rush-hour only (Virton – Rodange, Arlon – Rodange). |
| International | Lokale trein (Local train) | L | Regional trains from Belgium (Arlon – Rodange – Virton/Gedinne/Libramont) |
| National | InterRegio | IR | Long-distance train between Luxembourg and either Diekirch or Troisvierges (extension from Troisvierges with the Belgian IR m) |
| National | Regional-Express | RE | Regional trains, including extensions to border stations in France (Volmerange-les-Mines, Audun-le-Tiche, Longwy) and in Belgium (Athus) |

== Netherlands ==
In the Netherlands, the following train categories exist:

| Name | Abbreviation | Role |
|---|---|---|
| ICE International | | High speed train to Germany and Switzerland. |
| Eurostar | | High speed train to Belgium, France and the United Kingdom. |
| Intercity Direct | ICD | Semi-high-speed trains from Amsterdam to Schiphol Airport, Rotterdam and Breda in the Netherlands and to Antwerp and Brussels in Belgium. |
| InterCity | IC | Brand used by Nederlandse Spoorwegen (NS) for trains linking cities across the country, not calling at every station. Trains to Berlin are also branded Intercity. Typically calling at 25–50% of the intermediate stations they pass. Intercities are comparable to the InterRegio used in many European countries. Some call at every station for a part of their run near their terminus ("zone train"). |
| Sneltrein | RE | Brand used by operators other than NS on the regional railways for trains comparable to the Intercity, but typically running shorter distances. |
| Sprinter | S | NS brand, since 2018 also used by other operators, for local trains calling at (almost) every station on the mainline railway. |
| Stoptrein | RS | Brand used by operators other than NS for local trains calling at (almost) every station on all stations that are not located on the regional railways. |

== Norway ==
In Norway, there are the following train categories:

| Name | Abbreviation | Role |
|---|---|---|
| Fjerntog | F | Inter-city trains |
| Flyplasstog | FLY | Airport trains. Require special tickets |
| Regionalexpresstog | RE | Regional express trains |
| Regionaltog | R | Regional trains |
| Lokaltog | L | Local and commuter train services |
| Tunnelbane | T | Rapid transit trains in Oslo |

== Poland ==
The following train categories are present in Poland:

| Name | Abbreviation | Role |
|---|---|---|
| EuroNight | EN | High quality night trains; operated by PKP Intercity. |
| EuroCity | EC | International luxurious trains on the most important long-distance routes, must be reserved on domestic routes, up to 160 km/h (99 mph), operated by PKP Intercity. |
| Express Intercity Premium | EIP | High-speed, highest-standard trains requiring reservation. Made of modern train units operating on national routes, operated by PKP Intercity using units ED250 Pendolino. |
| Express InterCity | EIC | Luxurious trains in national services on the most important long-distance routes that must be reserved, with speeds up to 200 km/h (120 mph). Operated by PKP Intercity. |
| InterCity | IC | Trains of new EMUs and refurbished coaches, more comfortable than TLK, in national services on the most important long-distance routes, with speeds up to 160 km/h (99 mph). Operated by PKP Intercity. |
| Twoje Linie Kolejowe | TLK | Fast trains on inter-regional routes; some with speeds up to 160 km/h (99 mph). Operated by PKP Intercity. Pricing is the same as for IC services. |
| InterRegio | IR | A few trains between Warsaw and Łódź; cheaper than "TLK", but usually with lower standard, 2nd class only. Operated by Polregio. Rolling stock composed of refurbished EMUs of late 1960s design. Speed is up to 120 km/h (75 mph). |
| Regio | R | Local passenger trains, 2nd class only; Formerly called osobowy and often confused with that category. Trains are operated by Polregio. |
| Osobowy | os. | Osobowy are local passenger trains, 2nd class only. They are operated by Arriva RP (consortium of Arriva and DB Cargo Polska), Lower Silesian Railways, Lesser Poland Railways, Silesian Railways, Greater Poland Railways, Łódź Agglomeration Railway, Warszawska Kolej Dojazdowa and Masovian Railways. |
| Szybka Kolej Miejska | S | Rapid transit and commuter rail services in Tricity (operated by PKP SKM) and Warsaw (operated by SKM Warszawa), respectively. |

== Portugal ==
Trains in Portugal run under the following categories (sorted by operator):

Comboios de Portugal (state owned operator)

| Service | Name | Abbreviation | Role |
|---|---|---|---|
| Long-distance | Alfa Pendular | AP | Fast tilting trains used on the main north–south lines, only stopping at major intermediate cities with a top speed of 220 km/h (140 mph). Surcharge payable. |
| Long-distance | InterCidades | IC | InterCity trains used on main lines, stopping only at main towns with a top speed of 200 km/h (124 mph). Surcharge payable. |
| Long-distance | Internacional | IN | Day train Celta (Porto-Vigo). |
| Regional services | InterRegional | IR | Semi-fast trains used on main lines, stopping at all main towns and some smaller towns with speeds up to 160 km/h (99 mph). |
| Regional services | Regional | R | Stopping trains used on main lines, stopping at all stations (with some exceptions) with speeds up to 140 km/h (87 mph). |
| Commuter trains | Urbanos | U | Commuter trains used in or around the major cities with speeds up to 140 km/h (87 mph). |
| Leisure | Comboio Histórico do Douro | | Douro Valley Line Historic Train (Summer weekends only). |
| Leisure | Comboio Histórico do Vouga | | Vouga Line Historic Train (Weekends around some holidays). |

Fertagus (private operator)

| Service | Name | Abbreviation | Role |
|---|---|---|---|
| Commuter trains | Urbanos | U | Commuter trains in the Greater Lisbon Area with speeds up to 140 km/h (87 mph). Operations limited to the route between Roma-Areeiro – Setúbal. |

== Romania ==
In Romania, there are the following train categories:

| Name | Abbreviation | Role |
|---|---|---|
| Intercity | IC | It ensures the connection, in domestic or international traffic, between the country's capital Bucharest and the county seat cities, defined by Law no. 2/1968 on the administrative organization of the territory of Romania, republished, with subsequent amendments and additions. Speeds are up to 160 km/h (99 mph). |
| Intercity night | IC-N | It ensures the connection, in domestic or international traffic, between the country's capital and the county seat cities, defined by Law no. 2/1968 on the administrative organization of the territory of Romania, republished, with subsequent amendments and additions, and they passed through the night. They can also be put into circulation without first class or second class services. |
| Interregio | IR | It ensures the connection between the urban localities of rank 0, I and II defined by annex no. II point 3.8 of Law no. 351/2001 regarding the approval of the National Land Development Plan - Section IV - The network of localities, with subsequent amendments and additions, and the tourist resorts of national interest, listed in annex no. 5 of Government Decision no. 852/2008 for the approval of the rules and criteria for the attestation of tourist resorts, with subsequent amendments and additions. They can also be put into circulation without first class services. The average commercial/train speed is at least 45 km/h (28 mph). Convenient connections with other passenger trains will be provided at the main railway stations and junctions. |
| Interregio night | IR-N | It ensures the connection between the urban localities of rank 0, I and II defined by annex no. II point 3.8 of Law no. 351/2001 regarding the approval of the National Land Development Plan - Section IV - The network of localities, with subsequent amendments and additions, and the tourist resorts of national interest, listed in annex no. 5 of Government Decision no. 852/2008 for the approval of the rules and criteria for the attestation of tourist resorts, with subsequent amendments and additions. The average commercial/train speed is at least 45 km/h (28 mph). Convenient connections with other passenger trains will be provided at the main railway stations and junctions. They can also be put into circulation without first class or second class services. |
| Regio Expres | R-E | It ensures the connection between localities located at a maximum driving distance of 230 km (140 mi) or the first railway station, if this distance is exceeded. It has stops in railway stations that serve localities with a number of 2,500 inhabitants together with the neighboring areas, ensuring the need for mobility in that area. It provides connections to/from interregional trains. The average commercial speed is in principle at least 40 km/h (25 mph). They can also be put into circulation without first class services. |
| Regio | R | It ensures transport conditions for limited geographical areas, the maximum distance of circulation being 200 km (120 mi) or the first railway station, if this distance is exceeded. It has stops at all stations, halts and stops along the route, if the platforms are laid out in compliance with the Technical Specifications for Interoperability (TSI). Regional trains will be requested and routed at a sufficient time interval to allow boarding/disembarking of passengers to/from connecting trains at railway stations/junctions. The average commercial speed is in principle at least 35 km/h (22 mph). They can also be put into circulation without first class services. |
| Regio Metropolitan | R-M | It provides transport around major cities, for suburban (commuter) traffic, meets the transport needs of an urban center or a conurbation and nearby/adjacent areas, with a maximum travel distance of 40 km (25 mi) or the first railway station, if this distance is exceeded. The average commercial speed is in principle at least 30 km/h (19 mph). They can also be put into circulation without first class services. |

Former train categories in Romania
| Name | Abbreviation | Role |
|---|---|---|
| Personal | P | Local trains, stopping every station, speeds up to 120 km/h (75 mph). |
| Accelerat | A | Semi-fast trains, usually for long distances, speeds up to 140 km/h (87 mph), stopping at the main stations and some smaller towns. |
| Rapid | R | Fast trains, speeds up to 160 km/h (99 mph), stopping on major cities. |
| Euronight | EN | Night trains, night services of the IC/EC |
| EuroCity | EC | Stops only in major cities, speeds up to 160 km/h (99 mph). |
| InterCity | IC | Fast trains, speeds up to 160 km/h (99 mph), stopping only in major cities. |
| InterCity/EuroCity | IC/EC | National and international services, stopping in important stations only. |
| InterCity Night | ICN | Sleeping services assured. Calls at important stops only. May include cars from foreign operators and/or autoracks. |

== Russia ==
In Russia, the train category is defined by its number's digits.

| № | Name | Role |
|---|---|---|
| 1 to 150 | Skory | Skory (lit. 'fast') are all-year long-distance fast trains, mostly overnight. Speed is up to 160 km/h (99 mph), but usually the average speed is not more than 70 km/h (43 mph). |
| 151 to 298 | Skory Sezonny | Skory Sezonny (lit. 'fast seasonal') are seasonally operating fast trains, mostly similar to Skory. |
| 301 to 450 | Passazhirsky Dalny | Passazhirsky Dalny (lit. 'long-distance passenger') are long-distance stopping trains. |
| 451 to 498 | Passazhirsky Dalny Sezonny | Passazhirsky Dalny Sezonny (lit. 'long-distance passenger seasonal') are only seasonally operating Passazhirsky Dalny train services. |
| 501 to 598 | Passazhirsky Dalny Razovy | Passazhirsky Dalny Razovy (lit. 'long-distance passenger one-time') are additional or organized children groups carrying Passazhirsky Dalny services. |
| 601 to 698 | Passazhirsky Mestny | Passazhirsky Mestny, lit. 'local (medium-distance) passenger', are stopping trains travelling distances more than 150 km (93 mi), but less than 700 km (430 mi). |
| 701 to 750 | Skorostnoy | Skorostnoy, lit. 'speedy', are InterCity trains comparable to the Intercity in Germany. |
| 751 to 788 | Vysokoskorostnoy | Vysokoskorostnoy (lit. 'high-speed') are high-speed or Intercity-Express trains (Sapsan, previously also Karelian Trains's Allegro). |
| 801 to 898 | Obsluzhivaemyj dizel'- ili elektropoezdom | Mainline passenger trains featuring DMU / (out of the EMU-served Skorostnoy's and (all served by EMUs) Vysokoskorostnoy's) EMU rolling stock. Mostly fast versions of Passazhirsky Mestny. |
| 6001 to 6998 | Prigorodny | Prigorodny (lit. 'suburban') are suburban trains with a travelling distance of up to 150 km (93 mi), calling at (almost) all-stops. |
| 7001 to 7598 | Skory Prigorodny ili Gorodskoy | Skory Prigorodny ili Gorodskoy (lit. 'semi-fast suburban or urban') are semi-fast suburban and urban trains. |

== Serbia ==
In Serbia, trains run under the following categories:

| Name | Abbreviation | Role |
|---|---|---|
| EuroCity | EC | International trains to/from Austria, Bulgaria, Hungary, and Greece. Most EC services are inactive due to the renovation of the Belgrade-Budapest rail line. |
| InterCity | SOKO | Operates between Belgrade and Subotica in 1 hour 19 minutes. Speed is up to 200 km/h (120 mph). |
| Brzi | B | Fast train. |
| Regio Express | Rex | Fast train, usually during peak-hours |
| Regio | Re | Regional trains between Novi Sad, Subotica, Niš, Zrenjanin, Valjevo, Kraljevo, Užice, Sombor, Požarevac, Zaječar, Vršac, Kikinda, Prokuplje and Ruma. |
| BG Voz | BG | Urban railway lines in Belgrade. Lines are numbered 1–4 and operated by GSP. |

== Slovakia ==
Train categories in Slovakia are as follows:

| Name | Abbreviation | Role |
|---|---|---|
| LEO Express | LE | Private international trains to/from Czech Republic, operated by Leo Express company. |
| Regiojet | RJ | Private international trains operated by Regiojet company. |
| Railjet Express | RJX | Long-distance trains operating over the Bratislava—Vienna—Innsbruck—Zurich line. |
| EuroCity | EC | High quality, usually long-haul international services between Hungary, Slovakia, Czech Republic and Germany. Surcharge applied when travelling with domestic ticket. |
| EuroNight | EN | High quality night trains between Košice and Prague and between Budapest and Berlin. |
| Express | Ex | This category is used for long-distance domestic express trains between Košice and Bratislava, the two largest cities of the country. |
| Rýchlik | R | "Fast train" – trains for longer routes, usually stops at all towns en route, as well as important junctions. In this category there is the night train Zemplín between Humenné and Bratislava. |
| Regional-Express | REX | Local semi-fast train stopping at few stations, modern version of Zrýchlený vlak. Note that this category is also used by Leo Express between Komárno and Bratislava. |
| Zrýchlený vlak | Zr | Semi-fast train, stopping on most stations. It was mostly replaced by Regional Express; Zr trains run from Banská Bystrica to Margecany, or as summer tourist services (Letný vlak). |
| Osobný vlak | Os | Stopping train, serving all stations. |

Until 2024, train category of Intercity (IC) was used for express, for-profit trains operated by ZSSK between Bratislava and Košice. These were discontinued, as of December 2024. Supercity (SC) category was temporalily discontinued as a result of a derailment, after which ČD Class 680 „Pendolino“ tilting train service into Slovakia stopped until further notice. All SuperCity trains were reclassified into EuroCity trains.

== Slovenia ==
The following train categories exist in Slovenia:

| Name | Abbreviation | Role |
|---|---|---|
| EuroCity | EC | High quality international trains which operate along major international routes and connect important economic and tourist hubs in Slovenia and Europe. Journey times of EC trains are shorter and have fewer stops. Most of them have air-conditioned carriages and offer catering services. An additional supplement is required for travel on EC trains. |
| EuroNight | EN | High quality international night trains, which include sleepers and couchettes. A supplement is required for a bed or berth. For travel on a domestic EN, as with IC trains, it is necessary to pay a supplement for a seat in a standard carriage. On certain EN trains which operate across Europe, standard international prices apply together with a reservation fee. |
| InterCity Slovenija | ICS | Modern air-conditioned trains whose tilting technology allows for greater speed and comfort. They enable easier travel for passengers in wheelchairs, as well as offering a range of additional services. A buffet car is available to passengers. 1st class passengers also benefit from access to electrical plug sockets. At some stations free parking is available. ICS trains operate on the Ljubljana–Maribor–Ljubljana route. |
| InterCity | IC | High quality trains which operate on long-distance domestic and international routes and connect major cities, and commercial and tourist centres. They have shorter journey times with fewer stops. IC services require an additional IC supplement. |
| International train | MV | Connects nearby destinations across the national border. Journey times are typically shorter with fewer stops. A supplement is required when travelling domestically. |
| Cross-border train | MO | Connects nearby destinations across the national border. Seat reservations and supplements are not required to travel on these trains. |
| Regional train | RG | Connects Slovenian towns on shorter and longer routes. These are intended primarily for daily journeys to and from work or school. Seat reservations and supplements are not required to travel on these trains. |
| Local train | LP, LPV | Connects Slovenian towns on shorter and longer routes. These are intended primarily for daily journeys to and from work or school. Seat reservations and supplements are not required to travel on these trains. |

== Spain ==
In Spain, railway services are categorized as follows:

| Name | Role | Route(s) |
|---|---|---|
| AVE | Alta Velocidad Española (lit. 'Spanish high-speed') are high-speed trains operated by Renfe, with speeds up to 310 km/h (190 mph) | Madrid–Ciudad Real–Puertollano–Córdoba–Sevilla; Madrid–Ciudad Real–Puertollano–Córdoba–Puente Genil-Herrera–Antequera–Málaga; Madrid–Ciudad Real–Puertollano–Córdoba–Puente Genil-Herrera–Antequera–Loja–Granada; Madrid–Guadalajara–Calatayud–Zaragoza–Huesca; Madrid–Guadalajara–Calatayud–Zaragoza–Lleida–Tarragona–Barcelona(–Girona–Figueres); Madrid–Valladolid–Burgos; Madrid–Valladolid–León–Oviedo–Gijón; Madrid–Segovia–Valladolid–León; Madrid–Zamora–Ourense–Santiago de Compostela–A Coruña; Madrid–Zamora–Sanabria–A Gudiña–Ourense–Santiago de Compostela–Vilagarcía de Arousa–Pontevedra–Vigo; Madrid–Cuenca–Requena-Utiel–Valencia; Madrid–Cuenca–Valencia–Castellón; Madrid–Cuenca–Albacete–Villena–Alicante; Madrid–Cuenca–Albacete–Elche–Orihuela–Murcia; Burgos–Valladolid–Segovia–Madrid Chamartín–Elche–Orihuela–Murcia; Gijón–Oviedo–Mieres Del Camín–La Pola–León–Palencia–Valladolid–Segovia–Madrid Chamartín–Cuenca–Valencia–Sagunto–Castellón(–Benicàssim–Oropesa del Mar–Benicarló–Vinaros); Valencia–Requena-Utiel–Cuenca–Madrid Chamartín–Valladolid–Burgos; Valencia–Requena-Utiel–Cuenca–Madrid Chamartín–Segovia–Valladolid–Palencia–León; Sevilla–Córdoba–Puertollano–Ciudad Real–Zaragoza–Lleida–Tarragona–Barcelona; Sevilla–Córdoba–Madrid–Guadalajara–Calatayud–Zaragoza–Tardienta–Huesca; Sevilla–Córdoba–Puertollano–Ciudad Real–Cuenca–Valencia; Málaga–Antequera–Puente Genil-Herrera–Córdoba–Puertollano–Ciudad Real–Zaragoza–Lleida–Tarragona–Barcelona; Málaga–Madrid-Puerta de Atocha–Cuenca–Albacete–Villena–Alicante–Elche–Orihuela–Murcia; Barcelona–Tarragona–Lleida–Zaragoza–Córdoba–Puente Genil-Herrera–Antequera–Granada; Alicante–Albacete–Cuenca–Madrid Chamartín–Zamora–Ourense; Alicante–Albacete–Cuenca–Madrid Chamartín–Valladolid–Palencia–León |
| Avlo | Low cost high-speed trains of Renfe with speeds of up to 300 km/h (190 mph). | Madrid–Segovia–Medina Del Campo–Zamora–Sanabria–A Gudiña–Ourense–Santiago de Compostela–A Coruña; Madrid–Segovia–Medina Del Campo–Zamora–Sanabria–A Gudiña–Ourense–Santiago De Compostela–Vilagarcía de Arousa–Pontevedra–Vigo; Madrid–Valladolid–Palencia–León–La Pola–Mieres Del Camín–Oviedo–Gijón; Madrid–Ciudad Real–Puertollano–Villanueva de Córdoba–Córdoba–Seville; Madrid–Ciudad Real–Puertollano–Villanueva de Córdoba–Córdoba–Puente Genil-Herrera–Antequera–Málaga; Madrid–Cuenca–Requena-Utiel–Valencia; Madrid–Cuenca–Albacete–Villena–Alicante(–Elche–Orihuela–Murcia); Valladolid–Madrid Chamartín–Cuenca–Albacete–Villena–Alicante(–Elche–Orihuela–Murcia) |
| Alvia | High speed trains of Renfe capable of operating on both high-speed and conventional lines, with speeds of up to 250 km/h (160 mph). | Madrid–Palencia–León–Mieres Del Camín–Oviedo–Avilés; Madrid–Valladolid–Palencia–Aguilar de Campoo–Reinosa–Torrelavega–Santander; Madrid–Segovia–Valladolid–Burgos–Miranda de Ebro–Bilbao; Madrid–Segovia–Valladolid–Burgos–Miranda de Ebro–Vitoria–Zumarraga–Tolosa–San Sebastián–Irun; Madrid–Segovia–Medina del Campo–Salamanca; Madrid–Segovia–Medina del Campo–Zamora–Sanabria–A Gudiña–Ourense–Santiago de Compostela–A Coruña– Betanzos–Pontedeume–Ferrol; Madrid–Segovia–Medina del Campo–Zamora–Sanabria–A Gudiña–Ourense–Vilagarcía de Arousa–Pontevedra–Vigo; Madrid–Segovia–Medina del Campo–Zamora–Sanabria–A Gudiña-Ourense–Monforte De Lemos–Sarria–Lugo; Madrid–Guadalajara–Calatayud–Tudela–Tafalla–Pamplona; Madrid–Guadalajara–Calatayud–Tudela–Calahorra–Logroño; Madrid–Leganés–Torrijos–Talavera de la Reina–Oropesa–Navalmoral de la Mata–Monfragüe-plasencia–Cáceres–Mérida–Badajoz; Madrid–Cordoba–La Palma del Condado–Huelva; Madrid–Ciudad Real–Puertollano–Córdoba–Sevilla–Jerez de la Frontera–Cádiz; Madrid–Ciudad Real–Puertollano–Córdoba–Antequera–Ronda–San Roque-la Línea–Algeciras; Barcelona–Tarragona–Lleida–Zaragoza–Tudela–Castejon–Calahorra–Logroño–Haro–Miranda de Ebro–Bilbao; Barcelona–Tarragona–Lleida–Zaragoza–Tudela–Castejon–Tafalla–Pamplona–Altsasu–Zumarraga–San Sebastián; Barcelona–Tarragona–Lleida–Zaragoza–Tudela–Castejon–Tafalla–Pamplona–Vitoria–Miranda de Ebro–Burgos–Valladolid–Medina del Campo–Salamanca; Barcelona–Tarragona–Lleida–Zaragoza–Tudela–Castejon–Tafalla–Pamplona–Vitoria–Miranda de Ebro–Burgos–Palencia–Sahagun–León–Astorga–Bembibre–Ponferrada–O Barco de Valdeorras–A Rúa–San Clodio-Quiroga–Monforte de Lemos–Ourense–Santiago de Compostela–A Coruña; Barcelona–Lleida–Zaragoza–Pamplona–Vitoria–Burgos–León–Ponferrada–Ourense–Vigo; Alicante–Villena–Albacete–Cuenca–Madrid–Segovia–Valladolid–Palencia–Torrelavega–Santander; Alicante–Villena–Albacete–Cuenca–Madrid–Segovia–Valladolid–Palencia–León–La Pola–Mieres Del Camín–Oviedo–Gijón |
| Avant | High-speed trains of Renfe for medium distances (used to be called Lanzadera AVE). Speed is up to 250 km/h (160 mph). | Madrid–Toledo; Madrid Pta. Atocha–Ciudad Real–Puertollano; Madrid Chamartín–Segovia–Valladolid; Sevilla–Córdoba–Puente Genil–Antequera–Málaga; Barcelona–Tarragona–Lleida; Barcelona–Girona–Figueres; Barcelona–Camp de Tarragona–Cambrils–L'Hospitalet de l'Infant–L'Ametlla de Mar–L'Ampolla-Perelló-Deltebre–L'Aldea-Amposta–Tortosa.; Calatayud–Zaragoza; A Coruña–Santiago de Compostela-Ourense; Valencia–Requena Utiel; Granada–Loja–Antequera–Puente Genil/Herrera–Córdoba–Seville; Murcia–Beniel–Orihuela–Callosa Cox–Elx–Alicante; Toledo–Madrid–Cuenca–Albacete |
| Euromed | High-speed trains of Renfe that operate along the Mediterranean coast with speeds of up to 250 km/h (160 mph). | Barcelona–Tarragona–Castellón–Valencia(–Alicante); Figueres–Girona–Barcelona–Tarragona–Castellón–Valencia(–Alicante) |
| InterCity | Renfe trains for long-distance services operating on high-speed and conventional lines with less comfort and facilities than the AVE/Alvia trains, speeds up to 250 km/h (160 mph). | All over continental Spain |
| Media Distancia | Renfe trains for medium-distance services operating on Iberian or metre-gauge lines, speeds up to 160 km/h (99 mph) and 80 km/h (50 mph) respectively. | All over continental Spain |
| Iryo | High-speed ETR 1000 trainsets between Madrid and other cities. | Madrid Atocha–Zaragoza–Delicias–Tarragona–Barcelona; Madrid Atocha–Córdoba–Seville; Madrid Atocha–Córdoba–Málaga; Madrid Chamartín–Cuenca–Valencia; Madrid Chamartín–Cuenca–Albacete–Alicante |
| Ouigo España | High-speed TGV Euroduplex trainsets between Madrid and other cities. | Madrid Atocha–Zaragoza–Delicias–Tarragona–Barcelona Sants; Madrid Chamartín–Cuenca–Valencia; Madrid Chamartín–Cuenca–Albacete–Alicante; Madrid Chamartín–Segovia–Valladolid; Madrid Chamartín–Albacete–Elche–Murcia; Alicante–Albacete–Madrid Chamartín–Segovia–Valladolid |
| Cercanías (C#), Rodalies (R#) | Short-distance commuter rail services in metropolitan areas, with speeds up to 120 km/h (75 mph). Lines are numbered. | Barcelona, Bilbao, Cádiz, Cantabria, Ferrol, León, Madrid, Málaga, Murcia/Alicante, Oviedo, San Sebastián, Sevilla, Valencia, Zaragoza |
| Altaria | Trains of Renfe operating on high-speed and conventional lines, which use different locomotives. Their speed is up to 200 km/h (120 mph). (all discontinued) | Madrid–Ronda–Algeciras; Madrid–Antequera–Granada; Madrid–Murcia–Cartagena (only conventional lines) |
| Talgo | Tilting trains operating on high-speed and conventional lines, linking Madrid with provincial capital cities. Their speed is up to 150 km/h (93 mph). (all discontinued) | Madrid–Almería; Murcia–Barcelona |
| Arco | Conventional trains of Renfe that link Barcelona with other provincial capital cities. (all discontinued) | Barcelona–Mérida–Badajoz; Barcelona–Sevilla; Barcelona–Málaga; Barcelona–Granada; Barcelona–Almería |
| Trenhotel | Night services (all discontinued) | Madrid–Lisbon; Barcelona–Paris; Barcelona–Zürich; Barcelona–Milan C.le; Lisbon–Irun; Madrid–Santiago–A Coruña; Madrid–Vigo; Barcelona–Vigo; Barcelona–Gijón |

== Sweden ==
The SJ X2 is the only train operating in Sweden which is developed as a high-speed train. Other fast trains (EMUs) are developed as regional trains, but delivered with a maximum speed of 200 km/h (120 mph).

| Operator | Name | Role |
|---|---|---|
| SJ | Nattåg | Locomotive-hauled overnight train service in Sweden, with dining cars. |
| SJ | EuroNight (EN) | Locomotive-hauled overnight train service between Sweden, Denmark and Germany. |
| SJ | Snabbtåg | Higher-speed trains, operated with X2 or X55 trainsets, which are equipped with WiFi and have a bistro car. |
| SJ | InterCity | Rc locomotive-hauled, national and international trains with standard-seating carriages in both first and second class and a bistro car. |
| SJ | Regionaltåg | Regional trains on the Stockholm–Örebro–Gothenburg, Gothenburg–Karlstad and Gothenburg–Kalmar lines. Operated with either Rc-hauled trainsets or X40 EMUs. These trains have no catering on board. The X40 is equipped with free 4G WiFi. Both first and second-class are usually offered. |
| Counties | Regionaltåg | Regional trains operated by the county, usually with various brand names, such as Krösatåg, Mälartåg, Norrtåg, Øresundståg or Västtågen. |
| Counties | Pendeltåg | Commuter trains operated by the county in Stockholm, Gothenburg, Scania (locally called Pågatåg), and Östergötland (locally called Östgötapendeln). |
| A-Train | Arlanda Express | Train link between Stockholm Central Station and Arlanda Airport. |
| VR Snabbtåg Sverige | InterCity | Formerly MTRX, now a VR Group subsidiary, connecting Stockholm and Gothenburg with X74 EMU. |
| Snälltåget (Transdev) | EuroNight (EN) | Overnight trains between Stockholm and Berlin Hauptbahnhof (Germany) between April and September, and to Innsbruck Hauptbahnhof (Austria) in winter. |
| Snälltåget (Transdev) | | Long-distance trains between Malmö Central Station and Stockholm (and to Storlien during hiking and skiing seasons). |
| Tågab | | Long-distance trains on the Karlstad–Kristinehamn–Skövde–Gothenburg line. |
| MTR | Tunnelbana (T) | Metro system in Stockholm (Stockholms tunnelbana). |

== Switzerland ==
There are several railway companies in Switzerland, with Swiss Federal Railways (SBB CFF FFS), BLS and Südostbahn (SOB) operating the largest standard gauge networks and Rhaetian Railway (RhB) and MGB running the largest narrow gauge networks. As of 2024, the following categories exist:

| Name | Abbreviation | Role |
|---|---|---|
| Train à grande vitesse | TGV Lyria | High-speed service of SNCF and SBB between Switzerland and France. |
| InterCity Express | ICE | High-speed service of DB between Switzerland and Germany, the Netherlands. Typically, ICE 4 trainsets are used. |
| Railjet Express | RJX | High-speed service of ÖBB between Switzerland and Austria, Hungary, Slovakia. |
| EuroCity | EC | International long-distance (partly high-speed) trains, mainly of SBB, to destinations in Austria, Germany and Italy. Typically RABe 501 or ETR 610 trainsets are used (Transalpin is pulled by Re 420). |
| EuroNight | EN | International long-distance night trains between Zürich HB and destinations in Croatia, Hungary and the Czech Republic. |
| NightJet | NJ | International long-distance night trains of ÖBB between Zürich HB/Basel SBB and destinations in Austria, Germany and the Netherlands. |
| InterCity | IC# | Long-distance trains, fast connection (partly high-speed) between major cities in Switzerland by SBB (one DB service to Germany: Zürich HB–Schaffhausen–Stuttgart Hbf). Since 2018, all lines are numbered. Includes SBB RABDe 500 tilting trains, which previously ran under their own category (ICN). Otherwise, Re 460-hauled IC 2000 push-pull trains of SBB are typically used. |
| InterRegio | IR# | Switzerland's main train category. Long-distance train, fast connection between regions and centers in Switzerland (and Konstanz, Germany). All IR lines are numbered since 2018. Rolling stock varies but includes RABe 502 and RABe 511 trainsets of SBB, RABe 528 of BLS or RABe 526 of SOB. |
| Panorama Express | PE | Tourism-focused trains, often with large-windowed 1st class carriages that allow panoramic views. |
| RegioExpress | RE# | Fast regional train, does not call at all stations. Operates mainly in Switzerland, but some lines extend to Germany, France and Italy. All RE lines are numbered since 2023. Frequently SBB's RABe 511 are used. |
| Regio | R# | Regional train (e.g. of CJ, RegionAlps, RhB, transN). Mainly links towns and villages, calling at all stations. All R lines are numbered. |
| S-Bahn | S# | Fast trains in regional, local and suburban transport, operating with short clock cycles in the metropolitan areas of Basel, Bern, Chur, Lucerne, Schaffhausen, St. Gallen, Zug, Zurich and in Aargau. Some services extend to stations in Austria, France and Germany. TILO offers S-Bahn-like services in Ticino and Lombardy, Italy. In the French-speaking part of Switzerland, lines either use the letters R (RER Fribourg, RER Jura, RER Vaud) or L (Léman Express) instead of the letter S. All lines are numbered. |
| Metro | M# | Two rapid transit lines in Lausanne and Renens. |
| Extrazug | EXT | Unscheduled train. Usually to tackle high passenger volume, e.g. during holidays, sports events. |

== Ukraine ==
The following train categories are present in Ukraine:

| Service | Name | Abbreviation | Role |
|---|---|---|---|
| Day-time | Eurocity | ЄС | International long-distance services; 90–200 km/h (56–124 mph); 1st and 2nd class only. |
| Day-time | Intercity + | ІС+ | National long-distance services; 90–200 km/h (56–124 mph); 1st and 2nd class only. |
| Day-time | Intercity | ІC | National long-distance services; 70–160 km/h (43–99 mph); 1st, 2nd and 3rd class. |
| Day-time | Regional Express | PE | Regional services; 70–140 km/h (43–87 mph); 1st, 2nd and 3rd class. |
| Day-time | Regional train | P | Regional services; up to 120 km/h; 2nd and 3rd class only. |
| Day-time | Suburban Train | PП | Suburban train services; 3rd class only. |
| Day-time | City Train | M | Urban train services; 3rd class only. |
| Overnight | EuroNight | EN | International night train services; 90–200 km/h (56–124 mph); Lux, SV and Kupe classes. |
| Overnight | Night Express | НЕ | International and national night train services; 70–160 km/h (43–99 mph); Lux, SV, Kupe and Platzkart classes. |
| Overnight | Night Fast Train | НШ | National night train services; 50–140 km/h (31–87 mph); SV, Kupe and Platzkart classes. |
| Overnight | Night Passenger Train | НП | National night train services; up to 140 km/h (87 mph); Kupe and Platzkart classes. |

== United Kingdom ==
The United Kingdom's railway network is unusual in not publicly numbering or classifying its trains, except by the brand of the operating company. This may approach a classification system on lines where the express and local services are operated by different companies:

- Great Eastern Main Line: all services are operated by Greater Anglia, except for urban local services between London Liverpool Street and Shenfield. These services form the eastern leg of the Elizabeth line.
- Lea Valley Lines: services on the main route, regardless of stopping pattern, are operated by Greater Anglia. The Southbury Loop and Chingford branch routes are operated by London Overground.
- East Coast Main Line:
  - A variety of companies run intercity trains on the East Coast Main Line, of which the principal operator is London North Eastern Railway.
  - Regional and local services are run by Greater Thameslink Railway branded as Thameslink and Great Northern services between London and Peterborough, Northern between Darlington and Chathill, and ScotRail from Dunbar.
- West Coast Main Line:
  - Avanti West Coast is the dominant brand of intercity trains.
  - Stopping and semi-fast services are run by West Midlands Trains branded as London Northwestern Railway from London Euston as far as the junction for the Liverpool Lime Street branch, and by Northern between Wigan North Western & Preston.
  - Suburban services in London are run by London Overground, while those in Lanarkshire are operated by ScotRail.
- Great Western Main Line: suburban services stopping and semi-fast services between London and Reading is provided by the western leg of the Elizabeth line. All other trains, including Bristol's suburban network, are operated by Great Western Railway.
- Regional and regional express trains of Wales and suburban trains of Cardiff are operated by Transport for Wales Rail. The country's two intercity routes, through the Severn Tunnel and along the North Wales Coast Line, are operated by Great Western Railway and Avanti West Coast respectively.
- Brighton Main Line: Greater Thameslink Railway runs express trains branded as Gatwick Express to Gatwick Airport and Brighton. Other trains are branded by destination: those going via London Blackfriars are branded as Thameslink, others as Southern.
- In the North of England, local and suburban trains are almost exclusively run by Northern and regional express services by TransPennine Express.
- In Scotland, all trains not running to/from England are operated by ScotRail.
- In Northern Ireland, rail services are operated by NI Railways. Enterprise, a long-distance service between Grand Central station in Belfast and Connolly station in Dublin, is jointly operated by NI Railways and Iarnród Éireann.

In scheduling, trains are classified as express, local, sleeper, international or metro trains. However, these are not shown in passenger-facing publications, and express trains can have stopping sections calling at consecutive minor stops, acting as a local service on the section. For example, all trains run on the Thameslink core between London St Pancras and London Blackfriars, no matter express or local, call at all intermediate stations between them, creating a frequent metro-like service as an alternative to London Underground for travelling in central London.

For most longer distance services (such as the inter-city trains operated by CrossCountry), advance tickets are sold and seat reservations can be made. While on shorter services (e.g. South Western Railway Weymouth – London services), sometimes only counted-place reservations can be made but not for a specific seat for advance tickets, and on even shorter suburban services (e.g. South Western Railway Guildford – London stopping services), no reservation can be made at all and no advance tickets can be sold.

== Former Yugoslavia ==
In Yugoslavia, the following train categories were used:

Eurocity
international high-class trains
Intercity
trains used on national and international services on important long-distance routes
Intercity nagibni
Croatian Railways tilting train
Poslovni voz/vlak
Intercity – similar to express trains, usually 1st class only
Brzi voz/vlak
Express trains on long-distance routes, national and international
Zeleni vlak
Former Slovenian express multiple-unit connexions, also cross-border
Ubrzani vlak
semi-fast (like German Eilzug)
Putnički voz, Lokalni voz, Potniški vlak
Regional train stopping at all station, usually multiple unit trains

== Other European countries ==
- Estonia: Rail lines only use run numbers, not categories.
- Iceland: No railway lines.
- Latvia: Rail lines only use run numbers, not categories.
- Lithuania: Rail lines only use run numbers, not categories.
- Malta: No railway lines.
- Principality of Andorra: No railway lines.
- Principality of Liechtenstein: Only one railway line with three operational railway stations that are only served by an S-Bahn (S) service of the Austrian ÖBB.
- Principality of Monaco: Only one railway line and a single railway station, served by TGV inOui and TER PACA of the French SNCF.
- San Marino: Only a heritage railway line.
- Vatican: Only one railway line with one terminal railway station that is served by a regional train of the Italian Trenitalia.

== See also ==
- Passenger rail terminology
- Sleeper trains in Europe
- High-speed rail in Europe
- Eurail travel pass
- Interrail travel pass
- European Timetable
- The Man in Seat Sixty-One
- List of metro systems in Europe
- History of rail transport
