= ICE T =

German high-speed tilting train model

ICE T (DB Class 411/415)
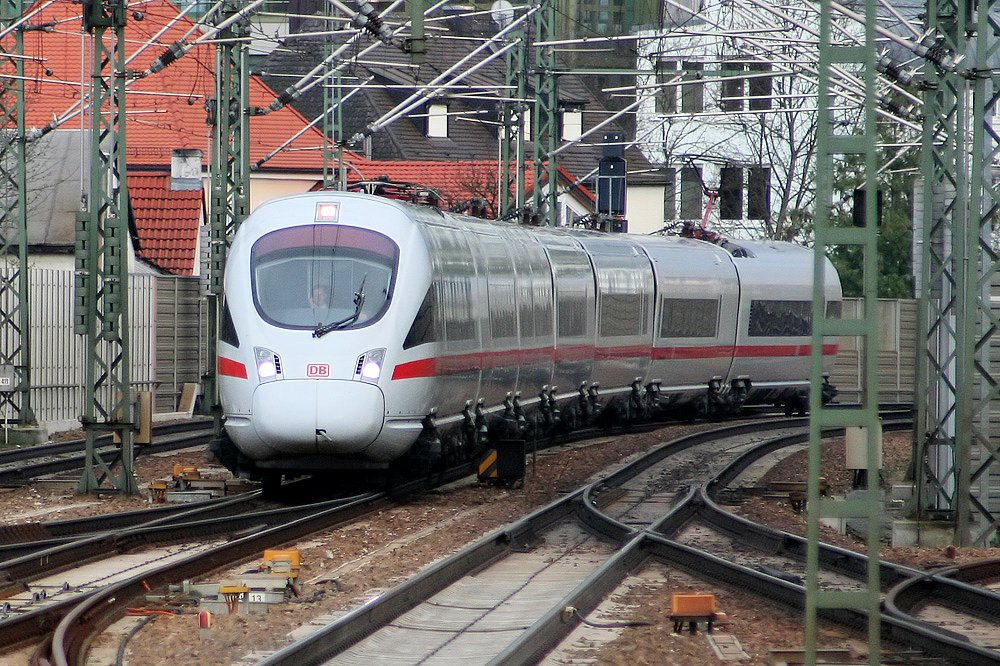
- ICE T trainset with visible tilting

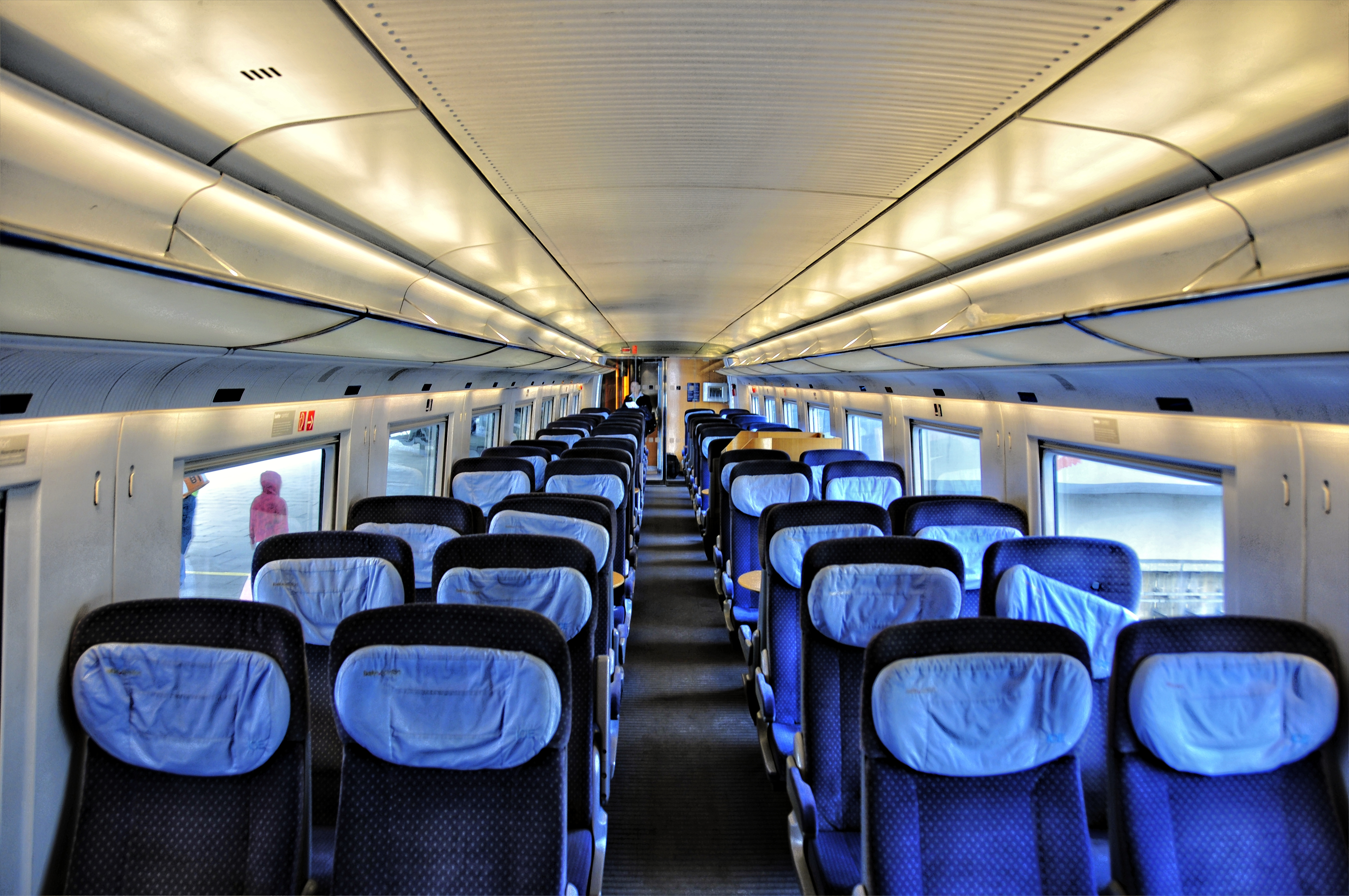
- Second class interior
- Stock type: Electric multiple-unit
- In service: 1999 - present
- Manufacturers: Siemens, Alstom
- Family name: Pendolino
- Number built: 60 trainsets (Class 411); 11 trainsets (Class 415)
- Formation: 7 cars (Class 411); 5 cars (Class 415)
- Capacity: 372 (Class 411); 260 (Class 415)
- Operators: Deutsche Bahn; ÖBB

Specifications
- Maximum speed: 230 km/h (145 mph)
- Traction system: Siemens GTO-VVVF
- Traction motors: Siemens 1TB 2223-0GB03
- Electric system: 15 kV 16.7 Hz AC overhead line
- Current collection: Pantograph
- Safety systems: Sifa, PZB90, LZB, Eurobalise
- Track gauge: 1,435 mm (4 ft 8 1/2 in) standard gauge

The ICE T or ICE-T, consisting of DB Classes 411 and 415, are German tilting electric multiple unit high-speed trains in service with DB Fernverkehr serving routes within Germany and to Austria.

== Development ==
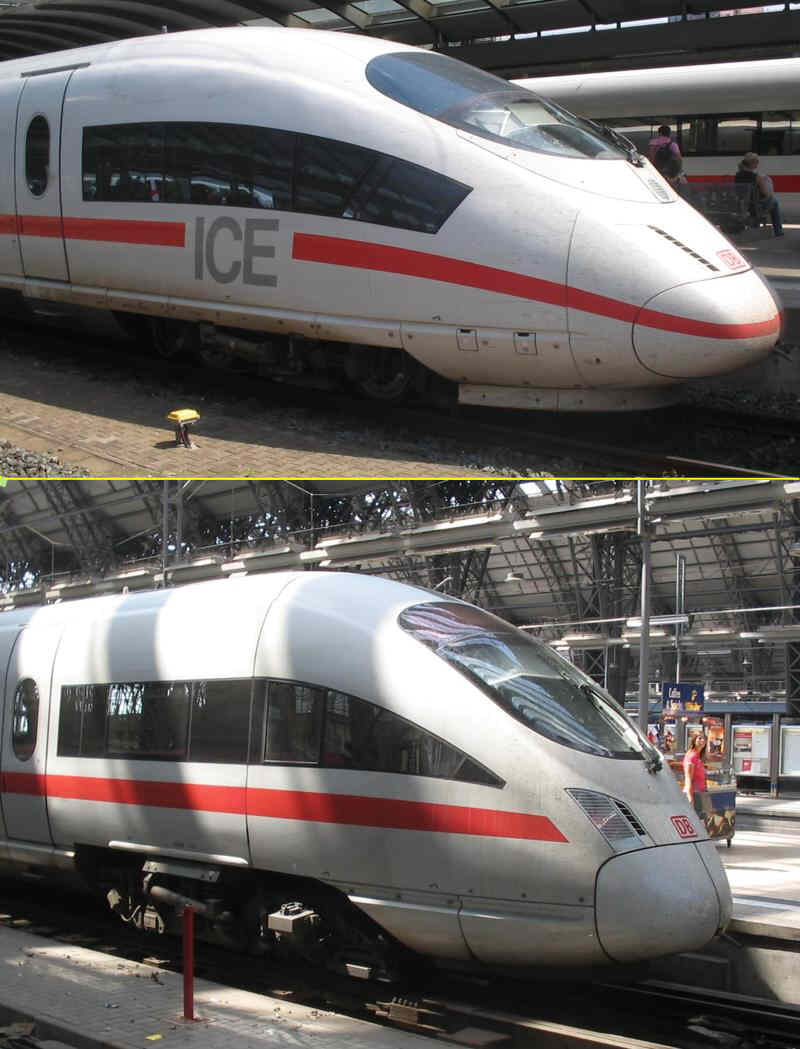
ICE 3 (above) and ICE T (below) fronts

Following the successful inauguration of the Intercity-Express system in 1991 and the order to develop the ICE 2, in 1994 DB started plans to upgrade long-distance services using conventional lines, with higher speeds and a comfort level close to the ICE standard, using tilting electric multiple units to replace locomotive-hauled InterCity (IC) and InterRegio (IR) trains. DB assigned the name IC T to the project, with "T" standing for Triebzug (multiple unit).

Later, Deutsche Bahn also saw the need for a similar new train for its non-electrified routes, and started the ICT-VT project, with "VT" standing for Verbrennungstriebwagen (internal combustion motor car). This development resulted in the diesel-powered ICE TD.

Deutsche Bahn developed the ICE 3, IC T and ICT-VT projects in parallel. The trains share a general styling concept, notably a lounge section in the front separated only by a glass wall from the driver's compartment, with a view forward over the tracks. Technically, the trains share a lot of components and technical layout, as well as the concept of distributed traction: in contrast to the ICE 1 and ICE 2 designs, the new units were planned not with power cars, but with peripheral underfloor motors, to reduce axle load (important for tilting trains) and increase tractive effort.

At first plans were made for a three-car EMU, but in the end, capacity considerations led to a decision to create trains of two different lengths, five (later class 415) and seven (later class 411) cars, the combinations of which allow a sufficient variety of train lengths with a maximum of three trains coupled (possible variations are: 5, 7, 10, 12, 14, 15 cars total).

== Production ==
The tilt angle can reach 8°

In 1994, Deutsche Bahn placed an order for 40 trains, revised to 43 trains (32 of the 7-car, 11 of the 5-car version) in 1997.

The trains were produced by a consortium led by DWA and including Siemens, Duewag and Fiat Ferroviaria. DWA (later taken over by Bombardier) produced the end cars, Duewag (owned by Siemens, later merged into the parent company) the middle cars, Siemens supplied the electronics and other main parts, and Fiat Ferroviaria (later bought by Alstom) supplied the bogies and the tilting technology.

The tilting technology is a hydraulic actuator system based on that of the Italian ETR 460 and ETR 470 second-generation Pendolino trains. In Pendolino bogies, only one axle is driven. In class 411 and class 415 motor cars, the inside axle of both bogies is motorised (configuration (1A)'(A1)').

After the German government abandoned the project of a Transrapid (maglev) line between Hamburg and Berlin, Deutsche Bahn decided to upgrade its conventional line between the two cities to 230 km/h (140 mph). To serve this line and increase capacity on other lines, in 2002 DB ordered an additional 28 seven-car trains from a consortium consisting of the successors of the companies in the previous one, but this time led by Siemens. This brought the total number of Class 411 trains to 60. The main changes were aimed at reducing costs.

=== Class 411 ===
The second (411.1), third (411.2), fifth (411.7) and sixth (411.6) cars are motorised, while the end cars (411.0 and 411.5) carry transformers supplying the next two cars. Thus each train consists of two power units of three coaches plus one unpowered middle car (411.8). The middle car can be removed, and theoretically the trains can be supplemented with an additional middle car.

The second batch of trains (with car numbers of 411 x51-411 x78) display a number of smaller modifications, mainly to reduce purchase and maintenance costs. The most visible differences outside were the lack of a through window band with tinted glass, and LED matrix headlights. The most apparent differences inside were the scrapping of on-board radio and the replacement of the restaurant with a standing bar. The trains also offer 8 additional seats for a total of 390.

=== Class 415 ===
Each five-car train forms a single power unit, with three motorised middle cars (415.1, 415.7, 415.6) between two end cars (415.0, 415.5) carrying transformers. Six trains are intended for domestic service, the other five (car numbers 415 x80-415 x84) for international service towards Switzerland, therefore they were also equipped with the Swiss train safety system and additional narrower pantographs for the Swiss network. As of 2025, the Class 415 mainly operates on the Dresden-Frankfurt am Main/Wiesbaden route.

The first class 415 train was assembled in the summer of 1998, when testing began. Trials with the activated tilting system started in October 1998. Software errors delayed the commissioning. The first class 411 was delivered in early 1999. Shortly before entering service, the product name of the trains was changed to ICE T, with "T" now standing for the English word tilt(ing). At the same time, the ICT VT became the ICE TD.

In 2025, Deutsche Bahn announced they would be gradually retiring the Class 415 from June 2025. Their last commercial run was on 21 February 2026.

=== ÖBB Class 4011 ===
Three class 411 units from the first batch have been sold to Austria's ÖBB as class 4011. They have undergone a few changes. Said changes include re-licensing the Class 411 units to A-ÖBB and changing the branding to the ÖBB logo

== Service history ==
Class 415 entered service on 31 May 1999 between Stuttgart and Zürich. Class 411 entered service on 19 December 1999 between Berlin and Düsseldorf via Magdeburg. Later, the Berlin–Munich and Frankfurt–Leipzig–Dresden routes were added.

On 6 January 2004, one unit (with cars numbered 411 x06) burnt out. Only the end cars remained intact, and have been used as temporary replacements for damaged end cars of other units.

Starting in December 2004, DB took the second batch of 28 more class 411 units into service on the upgraded line between Berlin and Hamburg. This was the first time the ICE T reached its top speed of 230 km/h in regular service. DB accepted the additional trains only after they proved themselves reliable in service, with all trains delivered by the 2006 FIFA World Cup. The trains were delivered with a standing bar in place of a restaurant; however, from 2007, all have been rebuilt with a restaurant.

When the capacity of the Switzerland-enabled five-car trains became too low for the Stuttgart–Zürich services, in 2006 the class 415 end cars (which carry the pantographs and the train safety equipment) were switched with that of class 411 trains, thus forming seven-car trains suitable for services to Switzerland. From the timetable change at the end of 2007, 15 class 411 trains modified for service in Austria (three of them sold to ÖBB, see section ÖBB Class 4011 below) connect Frankfurt and Vienna every two hours. Some of these trains come from Dortmund and go via Frankfurt to Vienna.

On 24 October 2008, DB temporarily removed all ICE T trains from service after a crack was found in an axle of one of the company's fleet of trains. All the trains were to be inspected for similar cracks and repaired as necessary before DB returned them to service. DB decided to sideline the trains after consultation with Siemens, Bombardier and Alstom revealed only "unclear information" about the expected life span of the axles.

At the start of November 2008, a quarter of the trains were back in service. The ultrasonic tests progressed at a speed of two trains a week, with tests on all trains expected to be finished by February 2009. Until the reason for the axle breaks is identified, the checked trains are operated with deactivated tilting system.

In January 2009, Deutsche Bahn CEO Hartmut Mehdorn suggested that the axles would have to be replaced with a new design. Development, production and installation of the new axles would take up to two years.

In April 2025, Deutsche Bahn announced the gradual retirement of the 5-car Class 415 from June 2025. Their last commercial run was on 21 February 2026.

== See also ==
- List of high speed trains
- Description of the Intercity-Express system in Germany
- Abstract on tilting trains in Germany
- ICE TD: the diesel sister class
- ICE 3: the non-tilting very high-speed sister class
