= Pendeltåg =

Pendeltåg can refer to several commuter rail systems in Sweden:

- Stockholm commuter rail, Stockholms pendeltåg
- Gothenburg commuter rail, Göteborgs pendeltåg
- Skåne commuter rail, Pågatågen (they are not called pendeltåg locally)
- Östgötapendeln
