= ICE TD =

Diesel multiple unit train type

DBAG Class 605
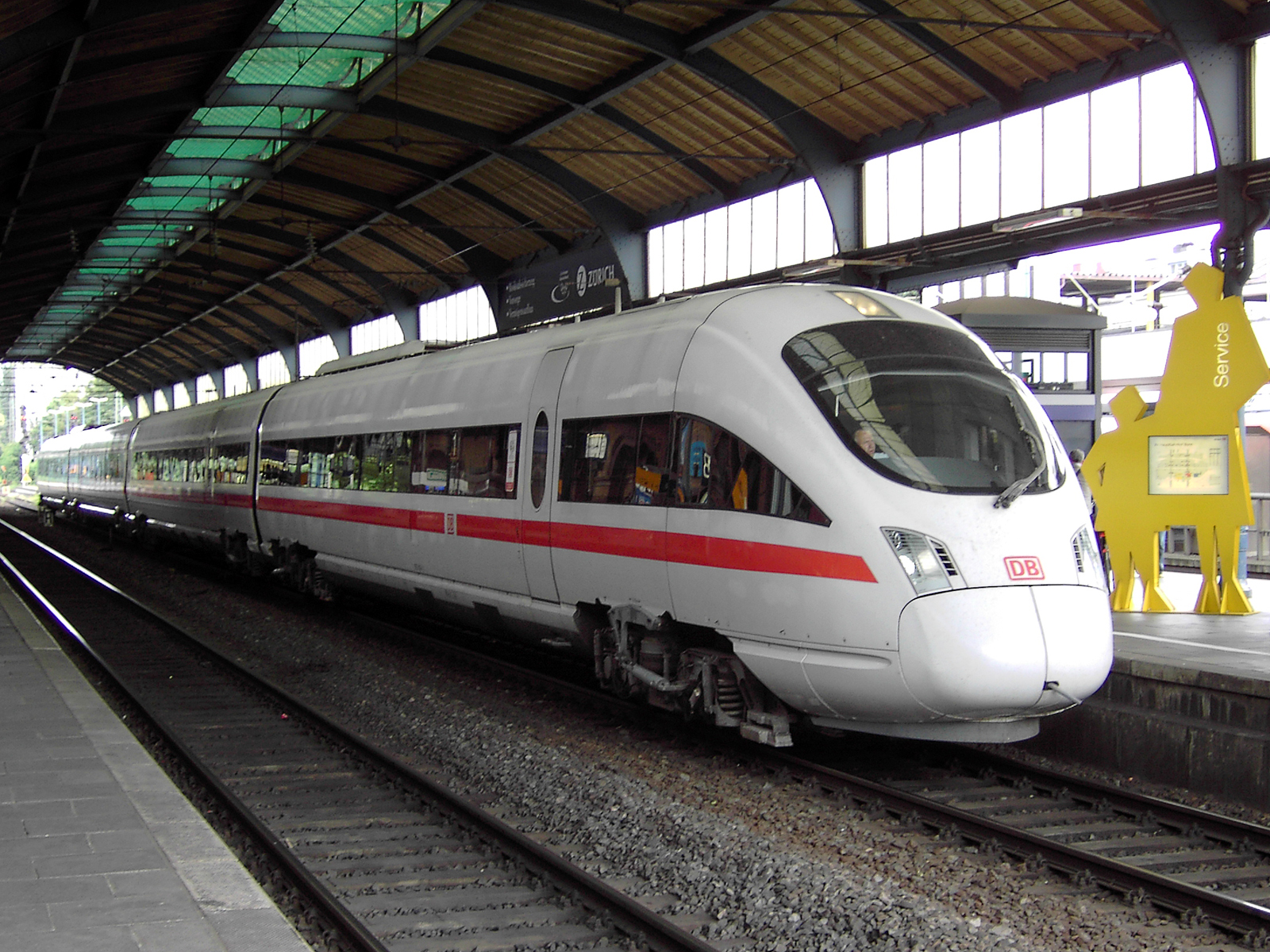
- ICE TD trainset

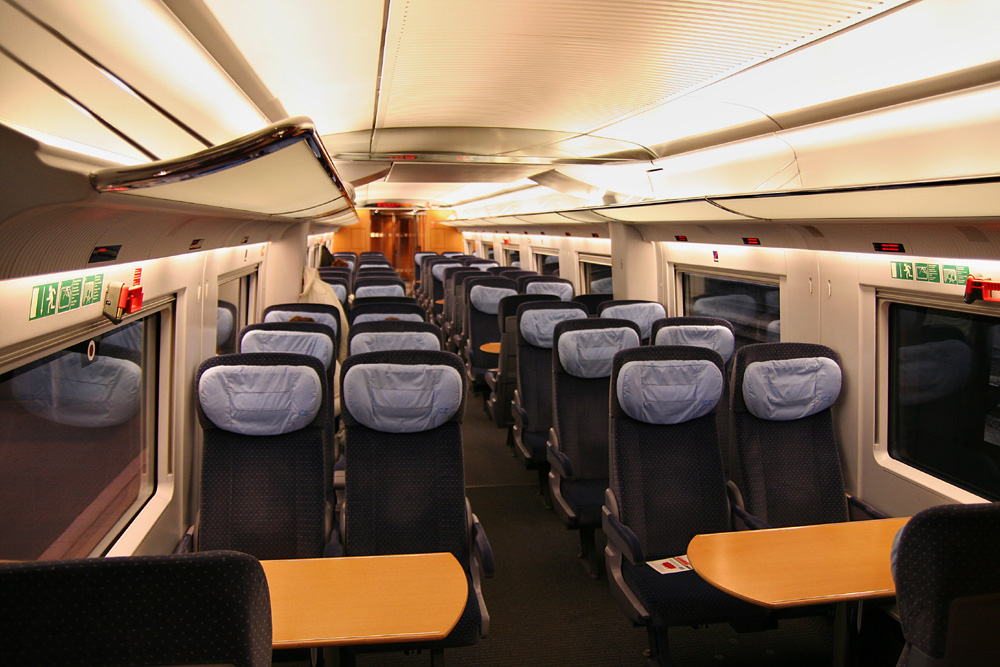
- Second class interior
- Stock type: Diesel-electric multiple unit
- In service: 2001–2017 (passenger service); 2019–present (test train)
- Manufacturer: Bombardier/Siemens
- Constructed: 1998–2000
- Number built: 20 trainsets
- Formation: 4 cars per trainset
- Capacity: 154 standard class, 41 first class
- Operators: DB Fernverkehr; DSB

Specifications
- Car body construction: Steel
- Articulated sections: Flexible diaphragm (within unit only)
- Maximum speed: 200 km/h (125 mph)
- Weight: 232 t (228 long tons; 256 short tons)
- Traction system: Siemens SIBAS 32 GTO-VVVF
- Prime mover: 4× Cummins QSK19
- Traction motors: 8× Siemens 1TB 2016 – 0GB02
- Power output: 4 × 560 kilowatts (750 hp) = 3,000 hp (2,200 kW) at 1,800 rpm
- Transmission: Diesel-electric transmission
- Gearbox: Voith SE-380
- UIC classification: 2′Bo′+Bo′2′+2′Bo′+Bo′2′
- Braking system: Rheostatic
- Safety systems: Sifa, PZB90, LZB, Eurobalise
- Coupling system: Dellner
- Track gauge: 1,435 mm (4 ft 8 1/2 in) standard gauge

The DBAG Class 605, commonly known as the ICE TD is a high-speed diesel multiple unit (DMU) train, formerly in service with Deutsche Bahn and DSB. It was retired from active passenger service in 2017 after years of operational issues with one trainset being kept and repurposed as a technology testbed.

== History ==
=== Development ===
Following the successful inauguration of the Intercity-Express system in 1991 and the order to develop the ICE 2, in 1994 DB started plans to upgrade long-distance services using conventional lines, with comfort level raised near the ICE standard and higher speeds, with tilting electric multiple units to replace locomotive-pulled InterCity (IC) and InterRegio (IR) trains. DB assigned the name IC T to the project, with "T" standing for Triebzug (multiple unit). This development resulted in the ICE T.

Later, Deutsche Bahn also saw the need for a similar new train on its non-electrified routes, and started the ICT-VT project, with "VT" standing for Verbrennungstriebwagen (internal combustion motor car).

Deutsche Bahn pursued the development of the ICE 3, IC T and ICT-VT projects in parallel. The trains share a general styling concept, most prominently a lounge section in the front cars with a view forward at the tracks, being separated only by a glass wall from the driver's compartment. Technically, the trains share a lot of components and technical layout, as well as the concept of distributed traction: in contrast to the ICE 1 and ICE 2 designs, the new units were planned not with powerheads, but with peripheral underfloor motors, in order to reduce axle load (quite important for tilting trains) and increase tractive effort.

For the ICT-VT, a four-car configuration was chosen, without a restaurant car, otherwise, Deutsche Bahn aimed for a common appearance and the greatest possible technical commonality with the IC T. Even the possibility of coupling together an electric and diesel train and operate them jointly was to be provided.

=== Production ===
In 1996, Deutsche Bahn placed an order for 20 diesel multiple units with a consortium led by Siemens.

As with the ICE T, DWA (Bombardier) produced the end cars and Siemens produced the middle cars. The ICE TD was fitted with an electro-mechanic tilting actuator system developed by Siemens, rather than the Fiat (Alstom) Pendolino hydraulic system used in the ICE T. Also, the secondary suspension between bogie and carbody is air springs rather than metal coils for higher ride comfort. A characteristic element of the Siemens system visible on the outside is the crescent-shaped top of the outer carbody supports (above the bogie center).

The tilting system also left room for electric motors on both axles in a bogie, thus every car of the diesel-electric train has an unpowered bogie and a powered bogie (2′Bo′ configuration). The power for the electric motors of the class 605 is generated by four diesel engines, one on each car, with 560 kW power each. These engines are based on engines for trucks. Electrically, the two halves of the train form two independent power units of two cars each, with the theoretical possibility of the addition of a fifth car as middle trailer.

The first train was assembled in 1998, trials on track started in April 1999. During a test run on 13 January 2000 with train set 5502, 222 km/h (138 mph) was achieved.

Shortly before the first IC T entered service in 1999, the names of the electric and diesel trains were changed to ICE T and ICE TD respectively, with "T" now standing either for the English word tilt(ing) or the German Triebzug (trainset, trains with underfloor-engines as opposed to the older ICEs which consisted of carriages coupled between locomotives), and "TD" for tilt(ing) / trainset diesel.

=== Operations ===
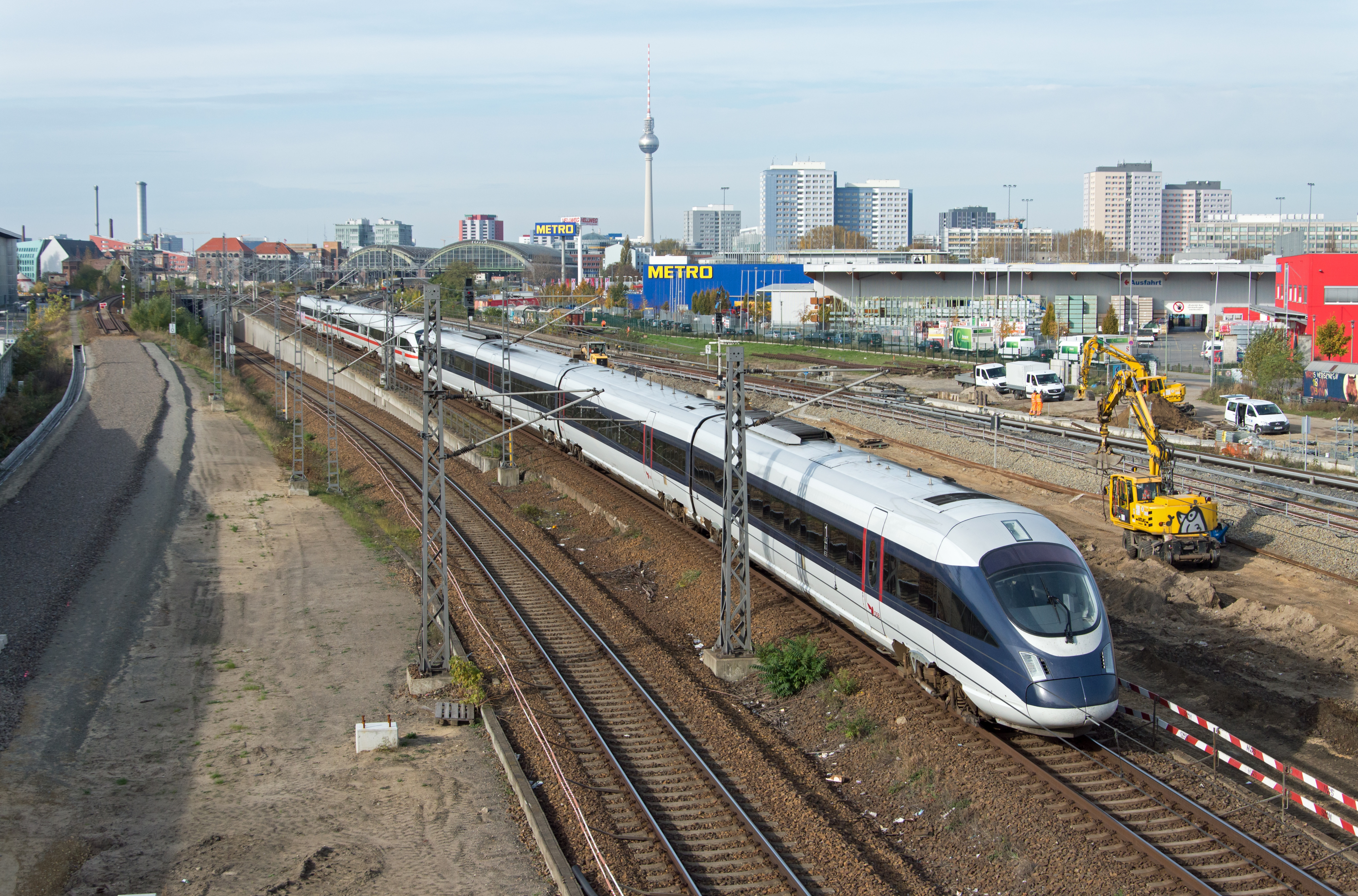
An ICE TD trainset in DSB livery on route from Berlin to Copenhagen (2014).

In 2001, all 20 units were commissioned for Deutsche Bahn, who numbered them as class 605. After pilot runs, the trains entered regular service on the new ICE line 17 between Dresden and Nuremberg from 10 June 2001. Shortly after, they were also used between Munich and Zurich as a replacement for EuroCity trains. Both of these routes between major cities were not fully electrified, which explains the use of the diesel powered trains.

The service life of the class 605 ICE TD units was rather ill-fated. They were plagued by technical problems from the start. After the breaking of an axle on 2 December 2002, all the remaining 19 units (one fell off a working platform during maintenance) were taken out of service and although the trains were placed back service one year later, DB judged their operation to be overly expensive. DB is required to pay full diesel tax for the fuel.

After four years of storage, the trains were re-activated for a short while, in anticipation of extra traffic during the 2006 FIFA World Cup being held in Germany. After this, they were used for charter and relief trains.

From the end of 2007, class 605 trains were used in regular service on the Berlin–Hamburg–Copenhagen route, as a replacement for the Danish IC3 trains in Hamburg–Copenhagen service (Vogelfluglinie), due to delays in the introduction of DSB's IC4 trains which were caused by technical problems. The ten class 605 used on these services were equipped with the Danish ATC safety system. From 2008, the Denmark-compatible 605 were also used for Berlin–Hamburg–Aarhus services (previously, IC3 was used on the Flensburg–Aarhus route, and regional trains on Hamburg–Flensburg services). From mid-2009, three more ICE-TD units were used on Germany–Denmark services, allowing DSB to free up more IC3 trains for domestic use.

=== Demise ===
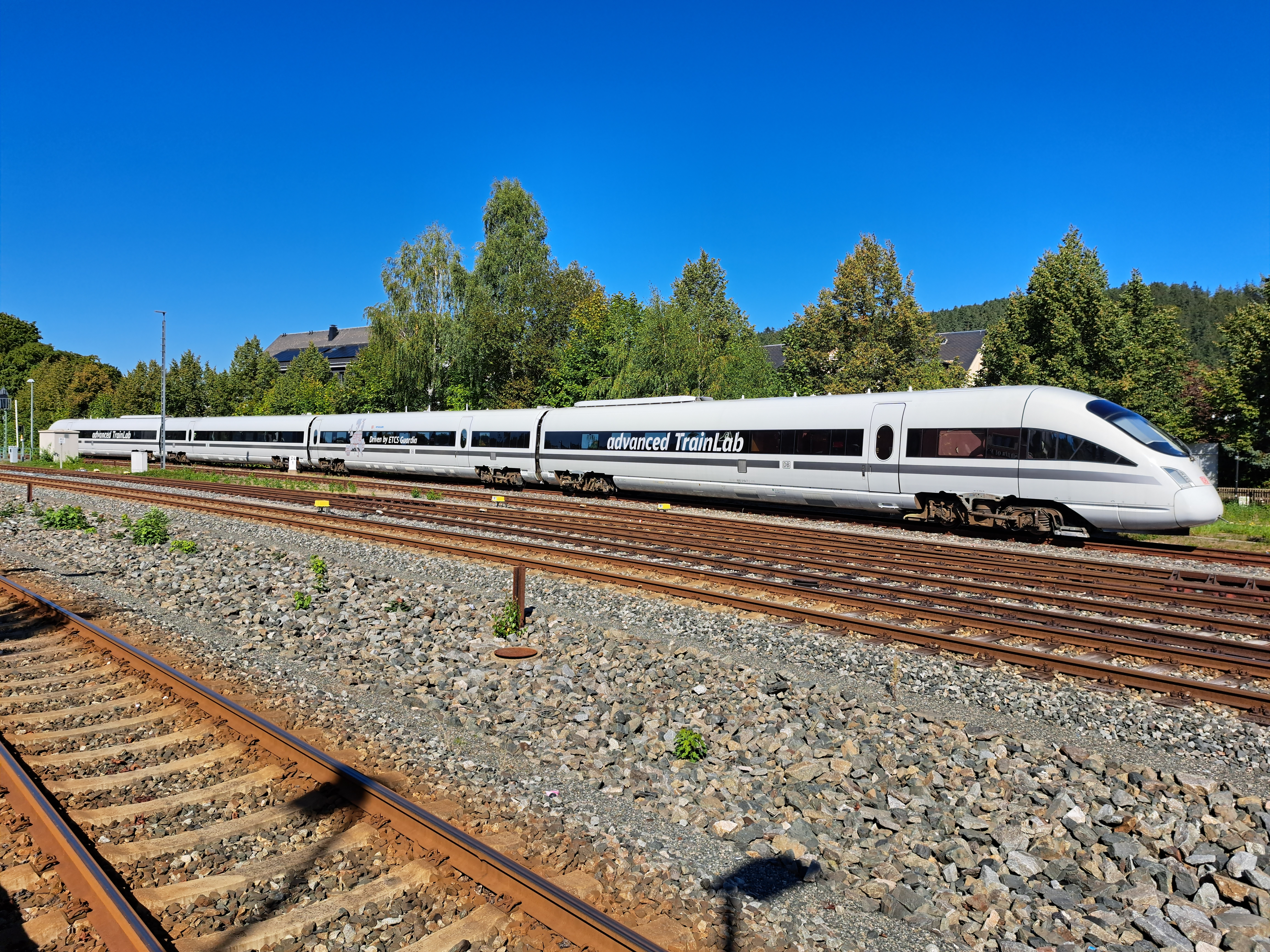
The sole remaining Class 605 trainset has been repurposed as the advanced TrainLab (2023).

On 11 December 2016, most class 605 trainsets were taken out of service. DB did not want to invest in the necessary major overhaul procedure where all components are checked and replaced if needed. DSB was offered the opportunity to buy the trainsets, but declined to do so. The trains suffered from overall high maintenance and operation costs. The Vogelfluglinie between Hamburg and Copenhagen continues to be operated with Danish IC3 trainsets as well as the Aarhus-Hamburg route, however both with fewer departures. One single remaining ICE TD trainset was operated on the Hamburg-Copenhagen route until 1 October 2017 and then also retired.

As of 2019, DB was in the process to gradually scrap most of the remaining ICE TD trainsets.

605 017 entered non-public service as a test train in February 2019, 605 019 followed in August 2021. Named Advanced TrainLab, the trains serve as a testbed for new technologies.

== Former routes ==
ICE TD trainsets were, in chronological order, used on the following routes:

- Nuremberg – Bayreuth – Chemnitz – Dresden (served June 2001 – December 2003; first replaced by Intercity and then Regional-Express trains)
- Munich – Lindau – Zürich (served June 2001 – December 2003; replaced by EuroCity trains)
- (Berlin –) Hamburg – Flensburg – Aarhus (served December 2007 – December 2016; replaced by IC3 trainsets)
- Hamburg – Lübeck – Puttgarden – Rødby – Copenhagen (served December 2007 – September 2017; first replaced by IC3 trainsets and since by InterCity coach sets)

== See also ==
- List of high speed trains
- Description of the Intercity-Express system in Germany
- Abstract on tilting trains in Germany
- ICE T
- Intercity Express
