= ÖBB Class 4011 =

Australian tilting electric train

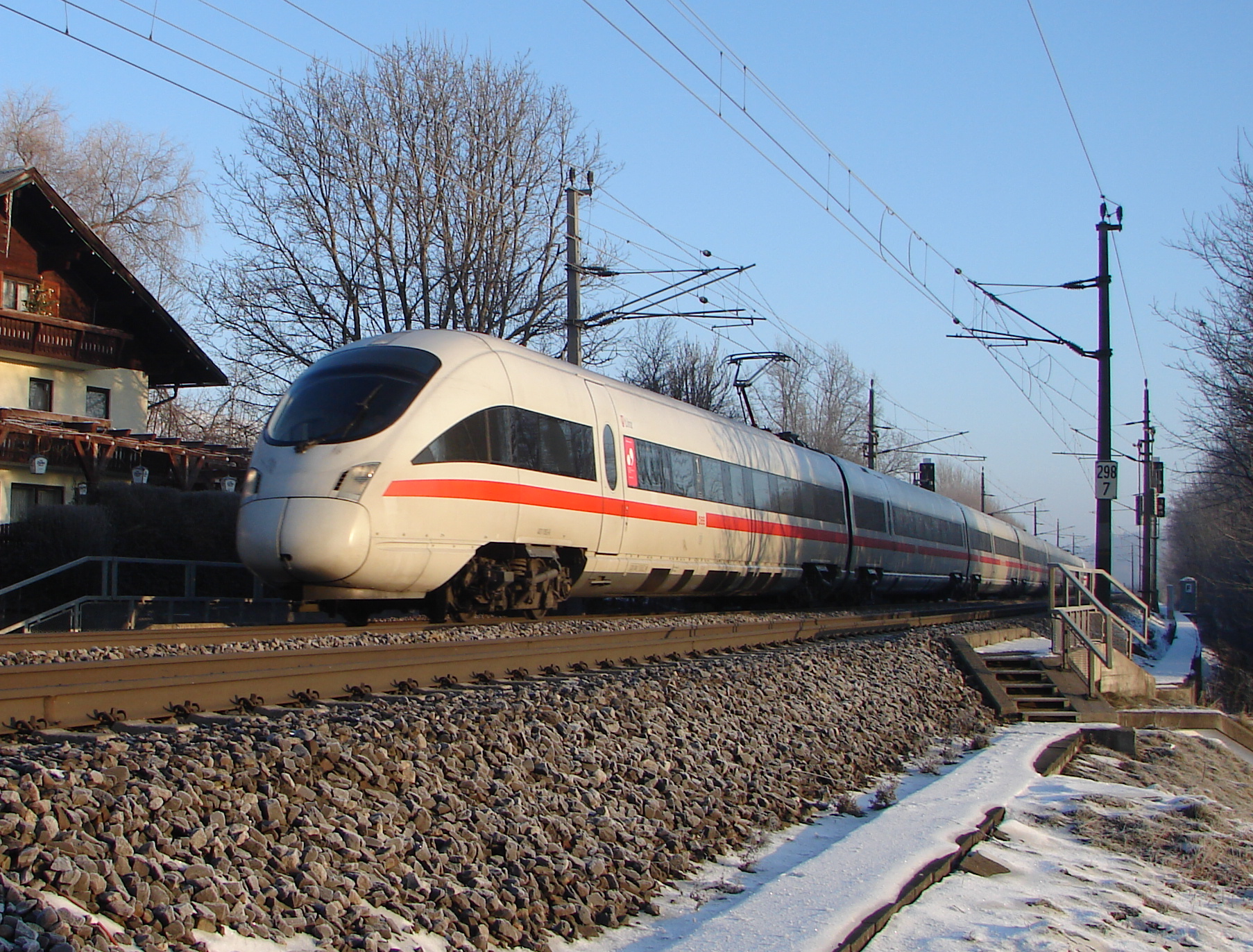
- ÖBB Class 4011 x92 Linz on the Western Railway line in Seekirchen am Wallersee (2009)
- In service: 1999–
- Manufacturer: Siemens Mobility
- Family name: Pendolino
- Number built: 3 trainsets
- Formation: 7 cars
- Capacity: 372
- Operators: Österreichische Bundesbahnen

Specifications
- Maximum speed: 230 km/h (145 mph)
- Electric system(s): 15 kV 16.7 Hz AC
- Safety system(s): Sifa, PZB90, LZB, Eurobalise
- Track gauge: 1,435 mm (4 ft 8 1/2 in)

ÖBB Class 4011 are Austrian tilting high-speed electric multiple-unit trains, in service with Austrian Federal Railway (ÖBB). They were introduced in 2006, when ÖBB purchased three German DBAG Class 411 units, commonly known as ICE T, from the first batch of 32 originally ordered by Deutsche Bahn (DB). These units (car numbers 411 x14 to 411 x14) were renumbered as class 4011 in ÖBB's numbering scheme (to car numbers 4011 x90 to 4011 x92). Together with 12 DB Class 411, they form a pool for joint operation services between Germany and Austria.

== Service history ==
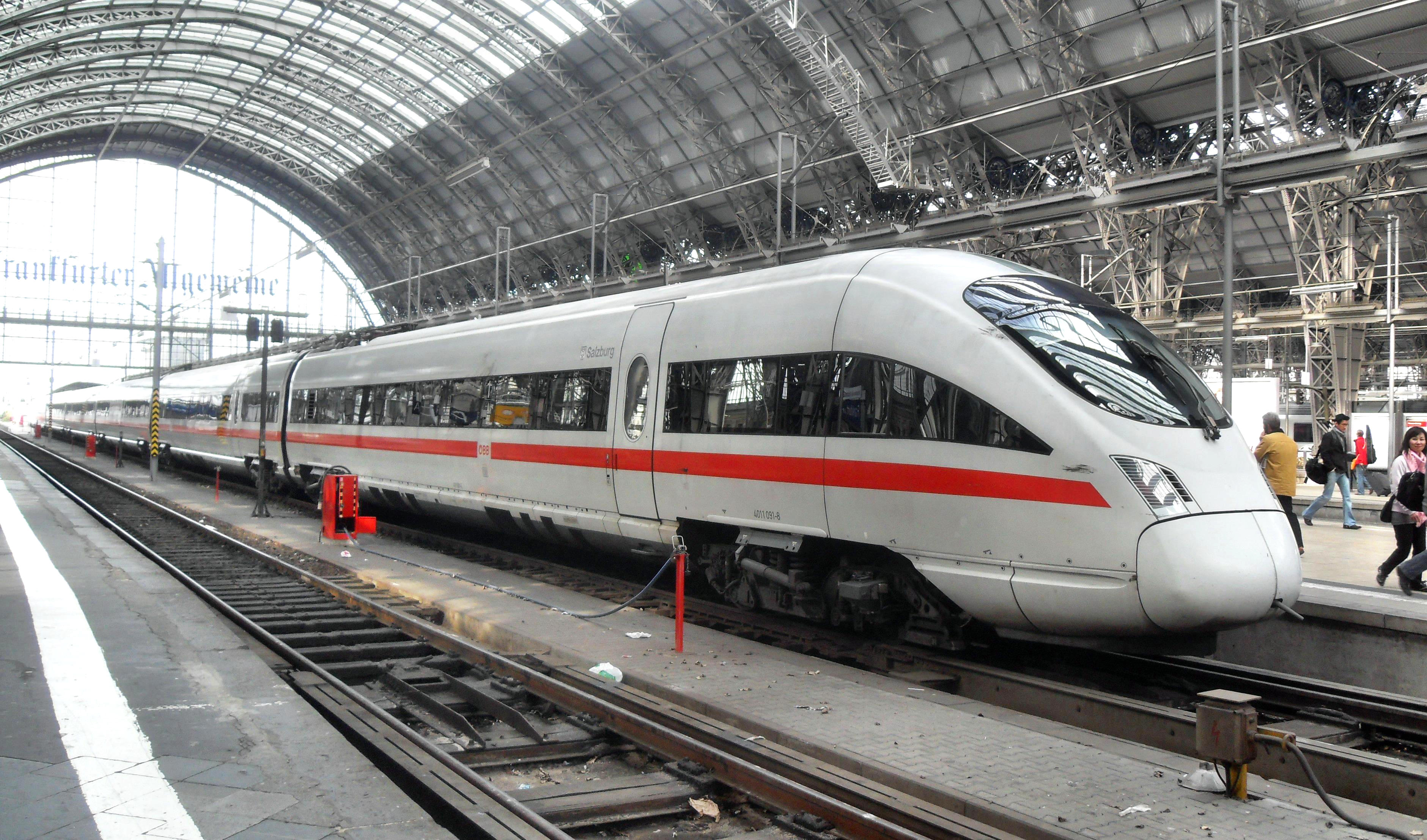
ÖBB Class 4011 x91 Salzburg at Frankfurt Hauptbahnhof

In 2004 ÖBB developed plans for the operation of ICE T trains in Austria and in October 2005 conducted several test travels with a DBAG Class 411 unit. In February 2006 the sales contract was signed with Deutsche Bahn; trains ran from December on the domestic Western Railway line from Vienna to Linz and Salzburg, and continued to Innsbruck and Bregenz as well as at cross-border level to Munich, Germany. Since 2007, ICE T trains link Vienna with Frankfurt at two-hour intervals as part of a joint venture between ÖBB and DB. Train service from Vienna to Bregenz and Munich is today provided by the ÖBB Railjet.

For operation in Austria, the three seven-part multiple units were modified, including LED matrix headlights like on the second batch class 411 trains, some software updates and clamps for ski transportation. On the outside, the most prominent distinguishing mark of the ÖBB class 4011 are the ÖBB logos replacing the DB ones in the gaps of the red stripe along the sides. For both the ÖBB class 4011 and the 12 DB class 411 fitted for operation in Austria, the logo of the other company is displayed in grey below the company's own logo.

== See also ==
- Intercity-Express
