= L'Aldea-Amposta-Tortosa railway station =

Railway station in Spain

L'Aldea-Amposta-Tortosa
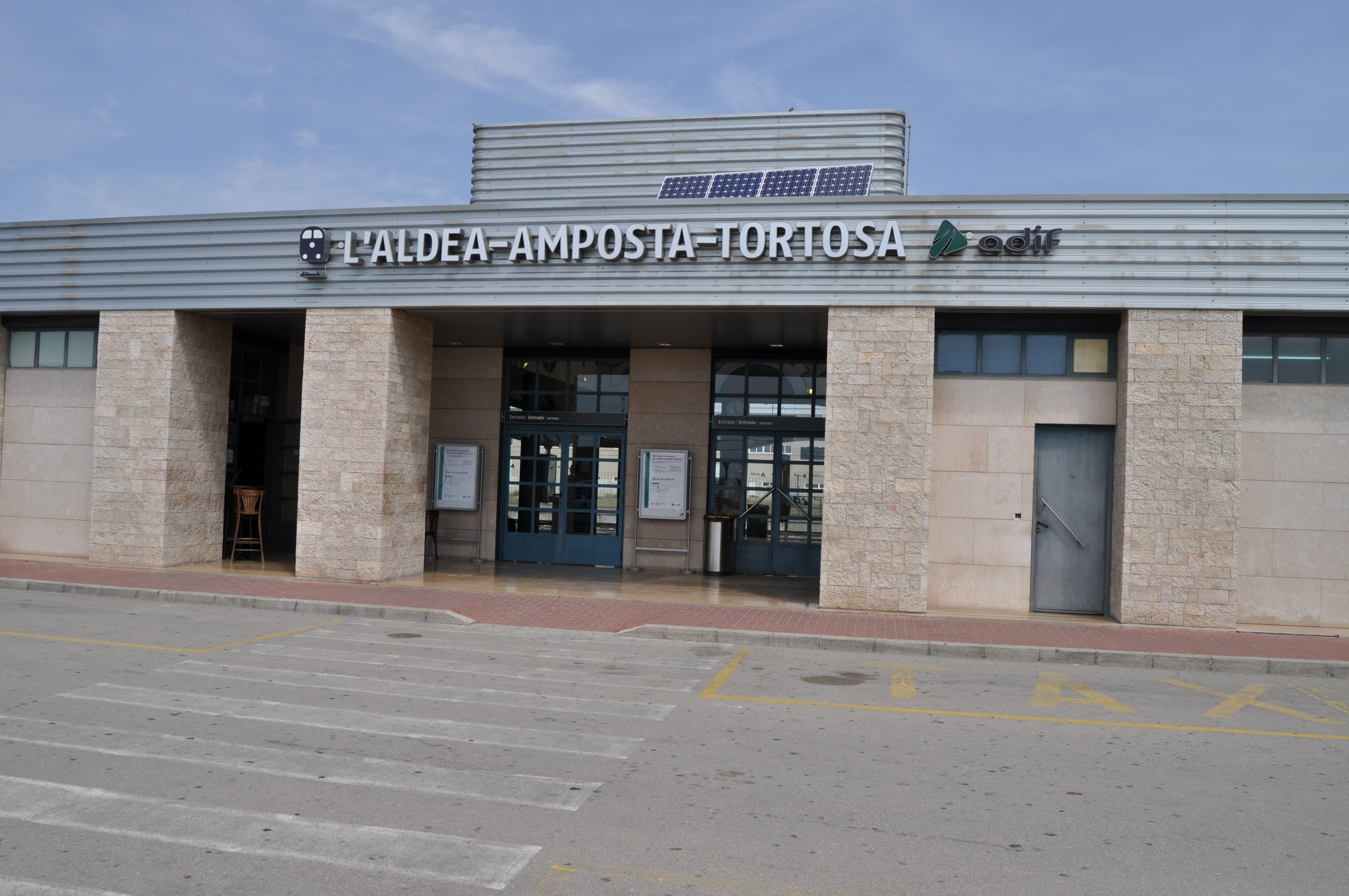
- Entrance of the station in 2018.

General information
- Owner: Adif
- Operator: Renfe
- Lines: Valencia–Sant Vicenç de Calders railway L'Aldea-Amposta-Tortosa railway

History
- Opened: 1865
Location

L'Aldea-Amposta-Tortosa railway station is the central railway station of L'Aldea, Spain, while it also serves the areas of Amposta and Tortosa. The station is situated on the Valencia–Sant Vicenç de Calders railway and is part of Adif and it accommodates Renfe long-distance and Rodalies de Catalunya medium-distance trains.

Preceding station	Renfe Operadora	Following station
Vinaròs towards Alicante	Intercity	Cambrils towards Barcelona Sants
Vinaròs towards Murcia del Carmen	Intercity	Cambrils towards Barcelona Sants
Vinaròs towards Cartagena	Intercity	Cambrils towards Barcelona Sants
Vinaròs towards Lorca-Sutullena	Intercity	Cambrils towards Barcelona Sants
Vinaròs towards Seville-Santa Justa	Intercity	Cambrils towards Barcelona Sants
Vinaròs towards Cádiz	Intercity Torre del Oro	Cambrils towards Barcelona Sants
Vinaròs towards Valencia Nord	Intercity	Cambrils towards Barcelona Sants
Ulldecona-Alcanar-La Sénia towards Valencia Nord	Media Distancia 50	Tortosa Terminus
Preceding station	Rodalies de Catalunya	Following station
Tortosa towards Ulldecona-Alcanar-La Sénia	R16	Camarles-Deltebre towards Barcelona Estació de França
Camp-redó towards Tortosa	R16	Camarles-Deltebre towards Barcelona Estació de França
