= Szybka Kolej Miejska =

Rapid Urban Railway (English: Fast Urban Railway, abbrev. SKM) is a generic Polish name for municipal rail transport network, and may refer to:

- Rapid Urban Railway (Warsaw)
- Szybka Kolej Miejska (Tricity)
