= Östgötapendeln =

Railway network in Sweden

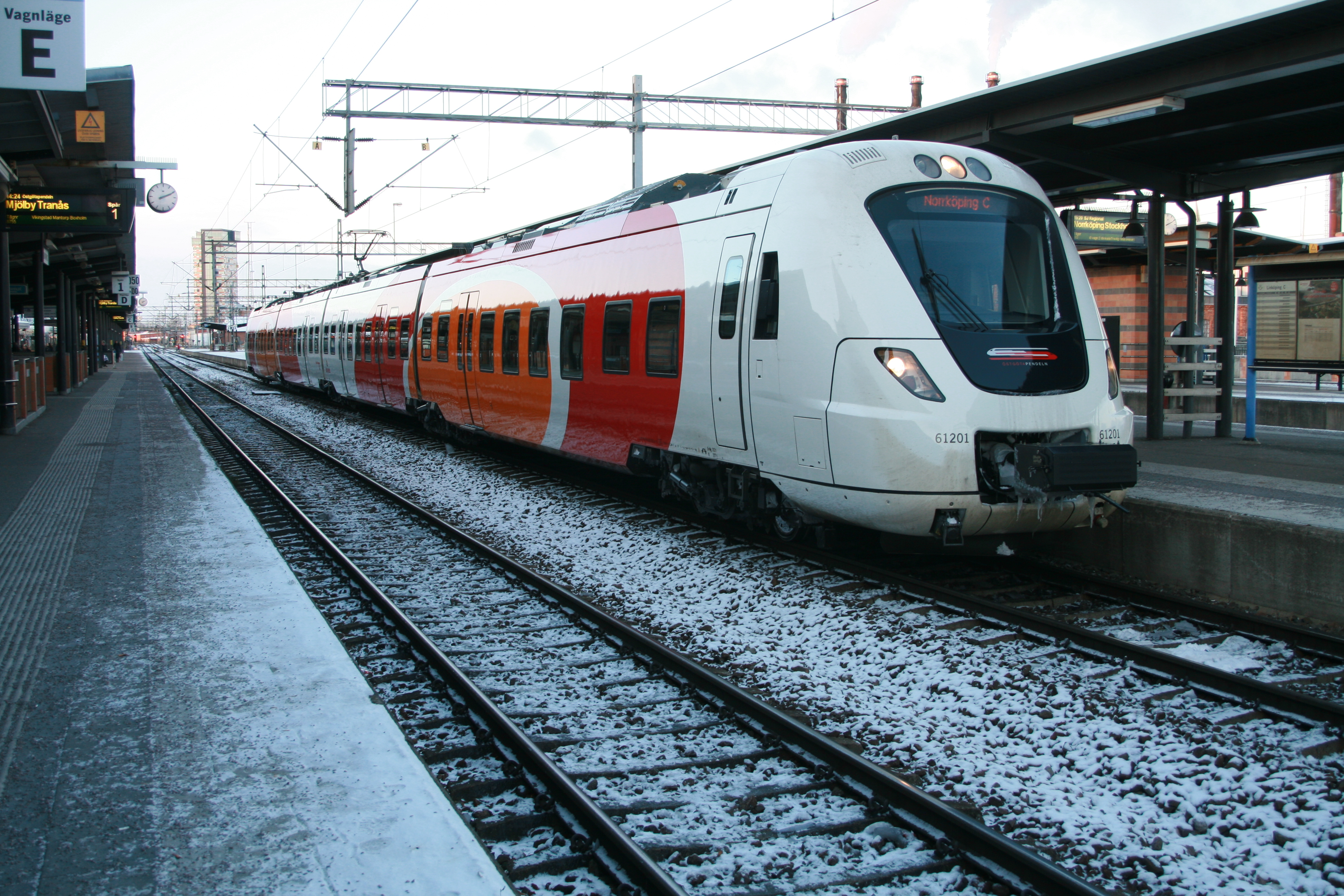

Overview
- Owner: Östgötatrafiken / Swedish Transport Administration
- Locale: Östergötland County
- Transit type: Commuter rail
- Number of lines: 2
- Number of stations: 17

Operation
- Began operation: June 12, 1995
- Operator: Arriva (Deutsche Bahn)
- Train length: 50–148 metres (164–486 ft)

Technical
- Track gauge: 1,435 mm (4 ft 8 1/2 in) (standard gauge)
- Top speed: 140–160 km/h (87–99 mph)

Östgötapendeln is a commuter rail system that stretches from the historical provinces Östergötland into Småland in Sweden. Östgötapendeln started its operation June 12, 1995 with the line Norrköping-Linköping-Mjölby-Tranås. In 2010–2015 Östgötapendeln trains continued to Nässjö and Jönköping. They have since been replaced by Krösatågen there. A second line, Norrköping-Linköping-Mjölby-Motala, opened in April 2013, with two new stops at Skänninge and Motala.

The frequency of the service is 4 trains an hour between Norrköping and Mjölby in peak hours, with 2 going to Motala and 2 to Tranås.

Arriva, a subsidiary of Deutsche Bahn is contracted to operate the trains until year 2020 by the passenger transport executives in Östergötland County.
