= Waggon Union =

Former German tram maker

- Type: Subsidiary
- Industry: Rail transport
- Founded: 1971; 55 years ago
- Defunct: 2001; 25 years ago
- Successor: Bombardier Transportation
- Headquarters: Hamburg, Germany
- Area served: Worldwide
- Products: Goods wagons Bogies for ICE 1 intermediate cars Trams; Buses
- Owner: Bombardier Transportation (1974-2021); Alstom (2021-Present)

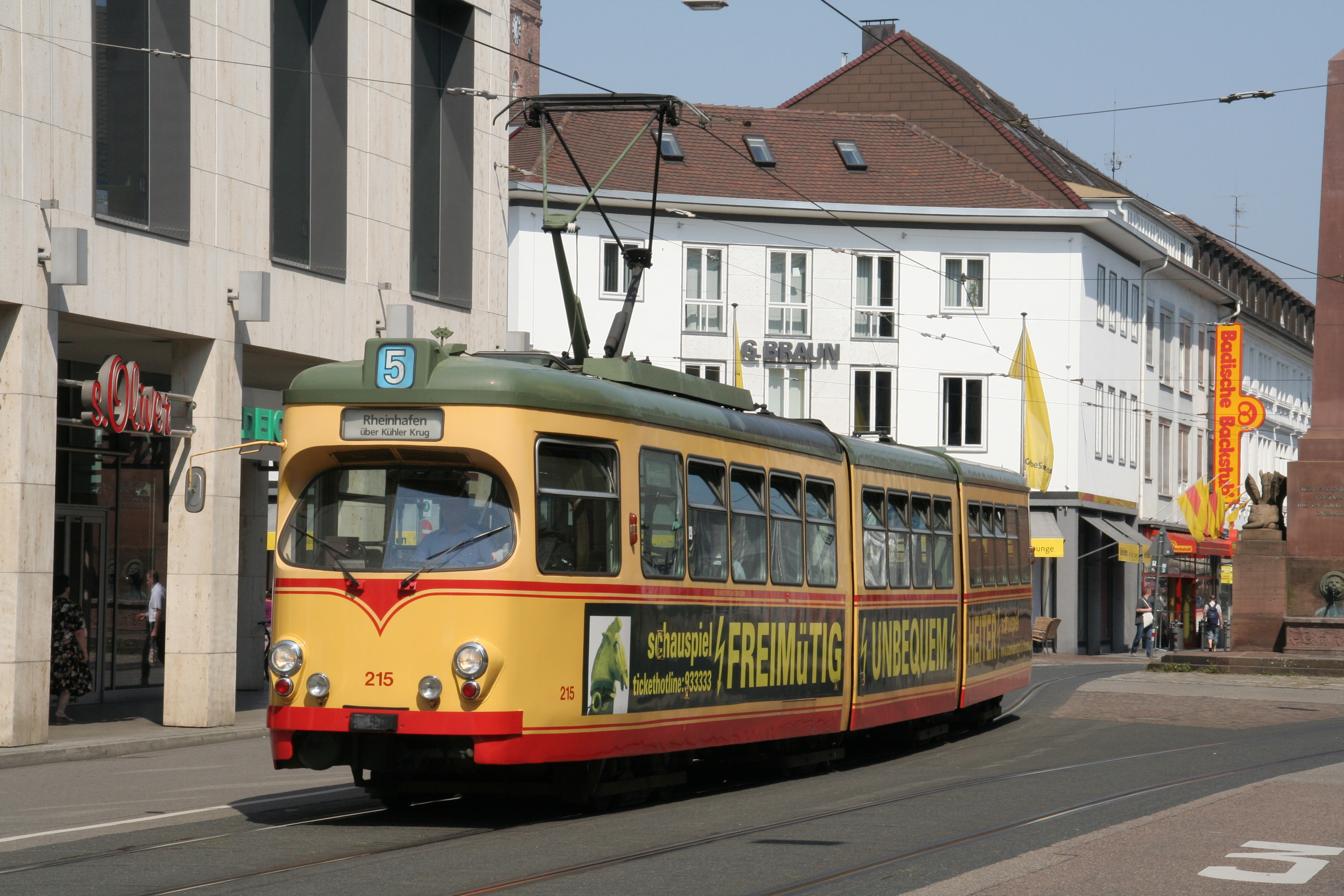
Karlsruhe (VBK) GT8-60C tram built by Waggon Union

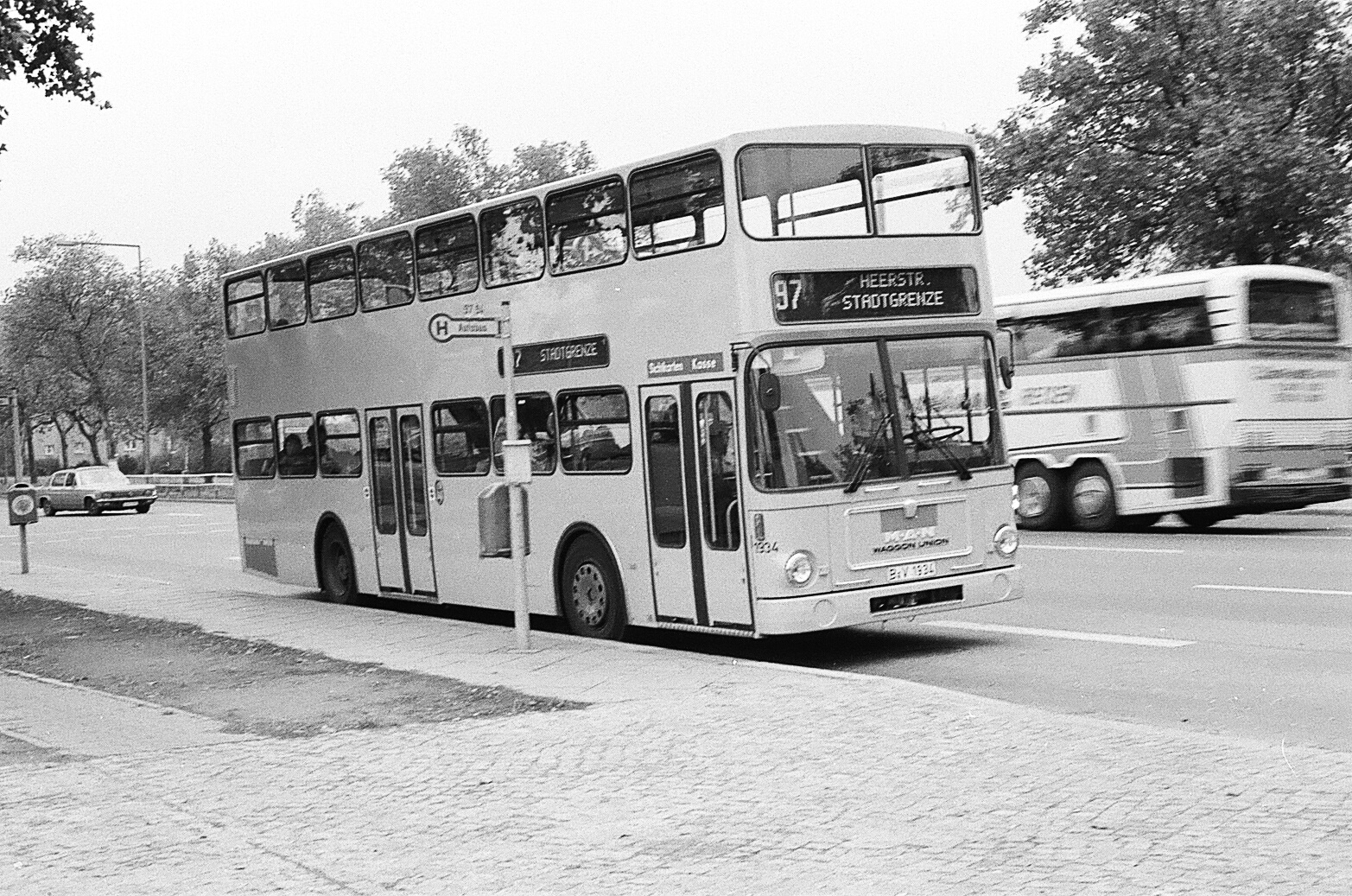
Berlin (BVG) double-decker bus with MAN chassis and Waggon Union body

Waggon Union was a German manufacturer of rail vehicles and bus bodies, that was also known as Deutsche Waggon und Maschinenfabrik (German Wagon and Machines Factory) or DWM.

== Background ==
The company was based in Berlin and was originally a branch of the Deutsche Waffen und Munitionsfabriken, a munitions manufacturer best known as the designer and maker of the Luger pistol. After World War II the Berlin establishment switched to the renovation and building of railway and other public transport equipment, and in 1952 it changed its name to Deutsche Waggon und Maschinenfabrik.

Waggon Union was bought by ABB Henschel in 1990. In 1996 ABB Henschel became part of ABB Daimler Benz Transportation (Adtranz), which was subsequently acquired by Bombardier of Canada.
