= DB Class 120 =

Class of German electric locomotives

Deutsche Bundesbahn Baureihe 120
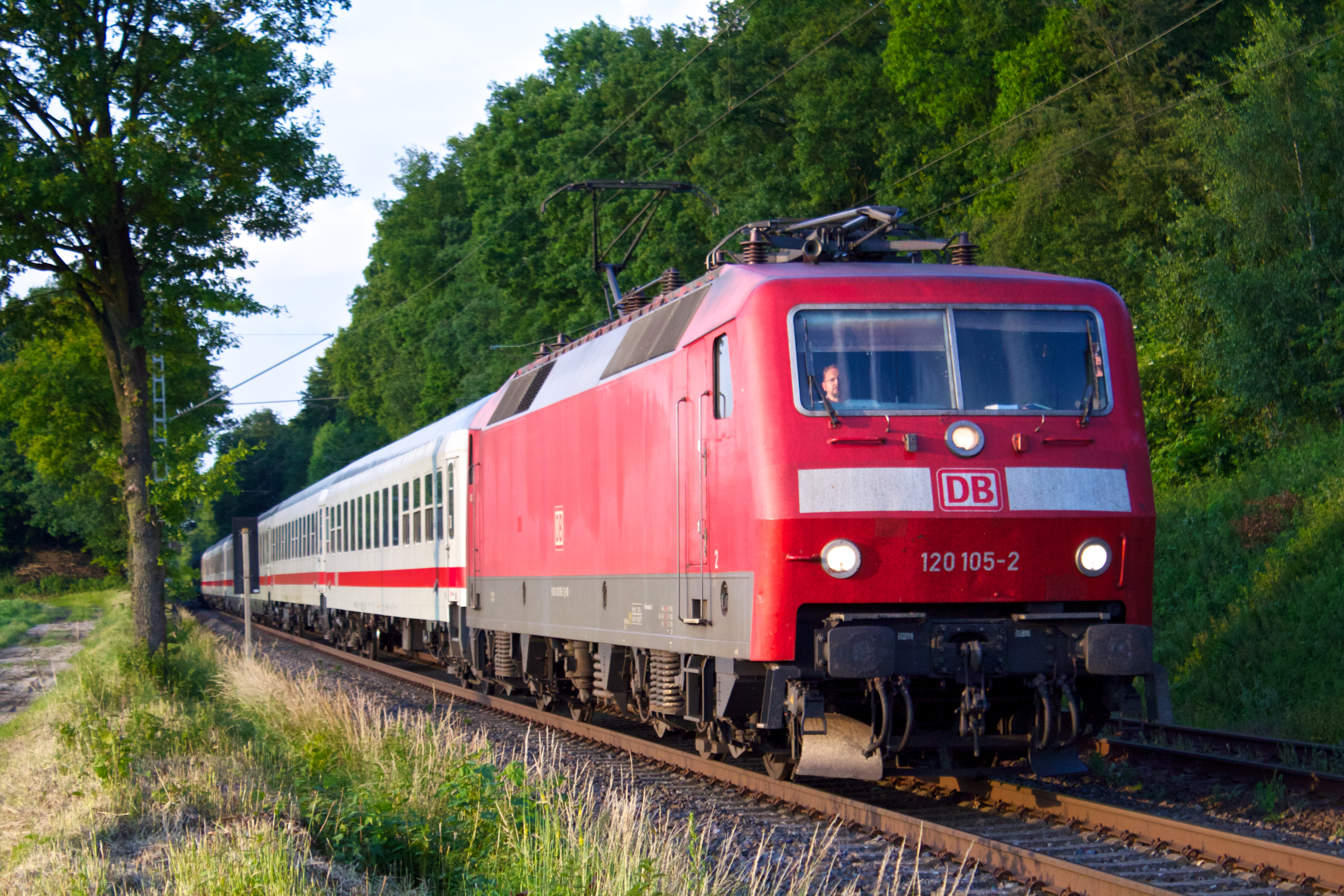
- 120 105-2 with an InterCity from Berlin to Cologne, 2013
Type and origin
- Power type: Electric
- Builder: BBC, Henschel, Krauss-Maffei, Krupp
- Build date: 1979–1980 (120.0); 1987–1989 (120.1)
- Total produced: 65
Specifications
- Configuration
  - UIC: Bo′Bo′
- Gauge: 1,435 mm (4 ft 8 1/2 in) standard gauge
- Length: 19.20 m (63 ft 0 in)
- Loco weight: 84.0 t (82.7 long tons; 92.6 short tons)
- Electric system/s: 15 kV 16 2/3 Hz AC Catenary
- Current pickup: Pantograph
- Traction motors: Four
- Loco brake: KE-GPR, electric brakes
- Train brakes: Air
- Safety systems: Sifa, Indusi
Performance figures
- Maximum speed: 200 km/h (124 mph)
- Power output: 5,600 kW (7,500 hp)
- Tractive effort: 340 kN (76,000 lbf) Max; 215 kN (48,000 lbf) @92.6 km/h (58 mph)
Career
- Operators: Deutsche Bundesbahn; Deutsche Bahn AG
- Class: 120
- Withdrawn: 2011 - 2023
- Disposition: retired

The DB Baureihe 120 is a class of electric locomotives operated by DB Fernverkehr in Germany. In November 2023, the last locomotives of this series were decommissioned by Deutsche Bahn. A few were sold to private railway companies and are operational.

== Background and design ==
The locomotives' prototypes, delivered in 1979 (Mark 120.0), were one of the first electric locomotives with three-phase motors controlled by thyristor-based power electronics. This principle, mainly devised by the German branch of Swiss-based Brown, Boveri & Cie laid the foundation for all current electric and diesel-electric rail engines. For this, the Mark 120 is often acclaimed as milestone in locomotive technology. They were based on experiments made in the 1970s with diesel-electric test platforms (Mark DE 2500/ DB Mark 202). In Norway, a new four-axle Locomotive, Mark El-17, was launched during 1983 with top speeds up to 93 miles per hour (150 km/h).

The design was intended to be the first truly universal locomotive, capable of pulling fast passenger trains as well as heavy freight trains. While the electric equipment exceeded expectations, the mechanical part suffered from its lightweight construction necessitated by the heavy electronics of the time.

After extensive tests, a series of 60 locomotives (Mark 120.1) were ordered in 1984 and delivered in 1986–1988. Original plans to build up to 2,000 machines were ultimately ended by German reunification and the politically driven decision to support the economy in the former DDR by procuring the DR 212 (DB BR 112) instead. The 120s went to DB Fernverkehr, the other divisions of Deutsche Bahn ordered locomotives that featured technologies from the 120, but were not direct successors. However, the class 120 locomotive formed the foundation for the power cars of the German high-speed trains ICE 1 and ICE 2.

== Technical data ==
	120.0	120.1
General
Operator	DB	=>
Manufacturing year	1979-19xx	1986–1988
Number of manuf.	5	60
Supplier mechanical part	Henschel, Krauss Maffei, Krupp	=>
Supplier electrical part	BBC, Siemens, AEG	=>
Axle arr	Bo-Bo	=>
Weight	84.0 t (82.7 long tons; 92.6 short tons)	=>
Axle load	21.0 t (20.7 long tons; 23.1 short tons)	=>
Max tractive eff	340 kN (76,000 lb_{f})	340 kN (76,000 lb_{f})
Max speed	280 km/h (170 mph)	200 km/h (120 mph)
Body
Length	19,200 mm (63 ft 0 in)	=>
Bogie distance	10,200 mm (33 ft 6 in)	=>
Height over pantograph	4,375 mm (14 ft 4.2 in)	=>
Body width	3,000 mm (9 ft 10 in)	=>
Coupling	buffers and chain	=>
Surface	smooth steel sheet	=>
Colour	wine-red beige	red, white
Bogies
Track width	1,435 mm (4 ft 8 1/2 in) standard gauge	=>
Wheel base	2,800 mm (9 ft 2 in)	=>
Wheel diameter, new	1,250 mm (49.21 in)	=>
Primary suspension	coil	=>
Secondary suspension	coil	=>
Brake	shoe, rheostatic, regenerative	shoe, regenerative
Bogie Weight	15.96 t (15.71 long tons; 17.59 short tons)	=>
Min hor radius	100 m (328 ft)	=>
Electrical equipment
Catenary voltage	15 kV	=>
Catenary frequency	16 2/3 Hz	=>
Max cont power	4.4 MW (5,900 hp)	=>
Traction motor	QD646	BQg 4843
Max power trainheating	900 kW (1,200 hp)	=>

== Gallery ==
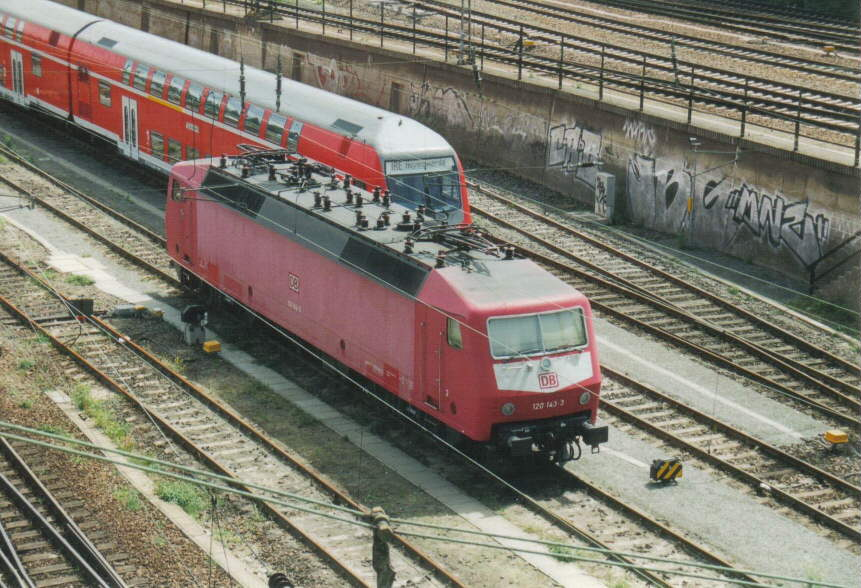
120 143 in Dresden

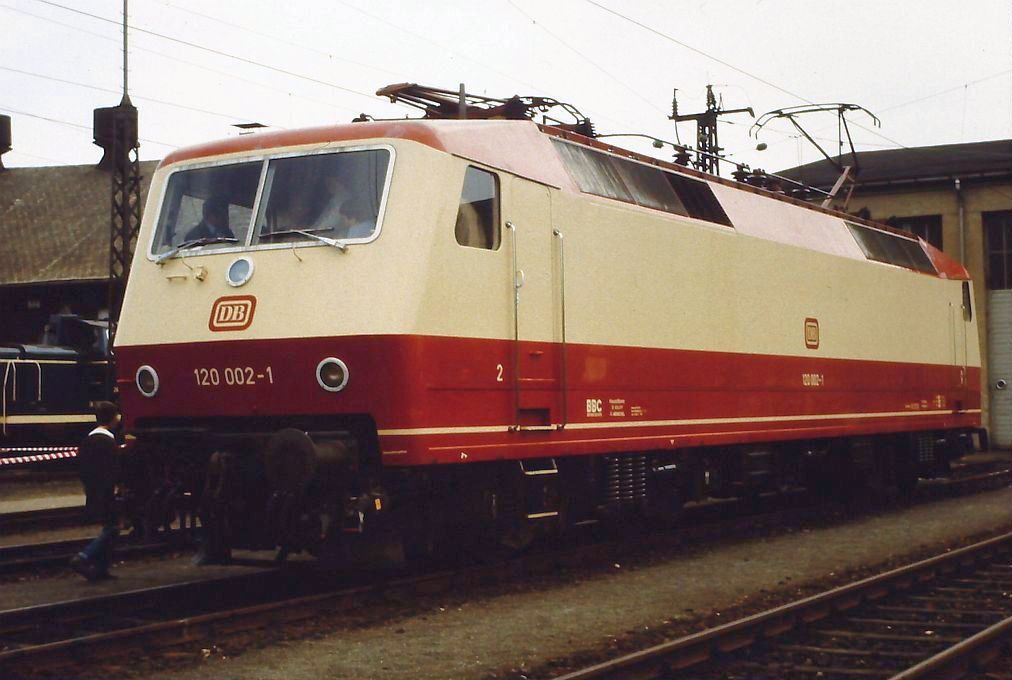
120 002 in Würzburg 1984

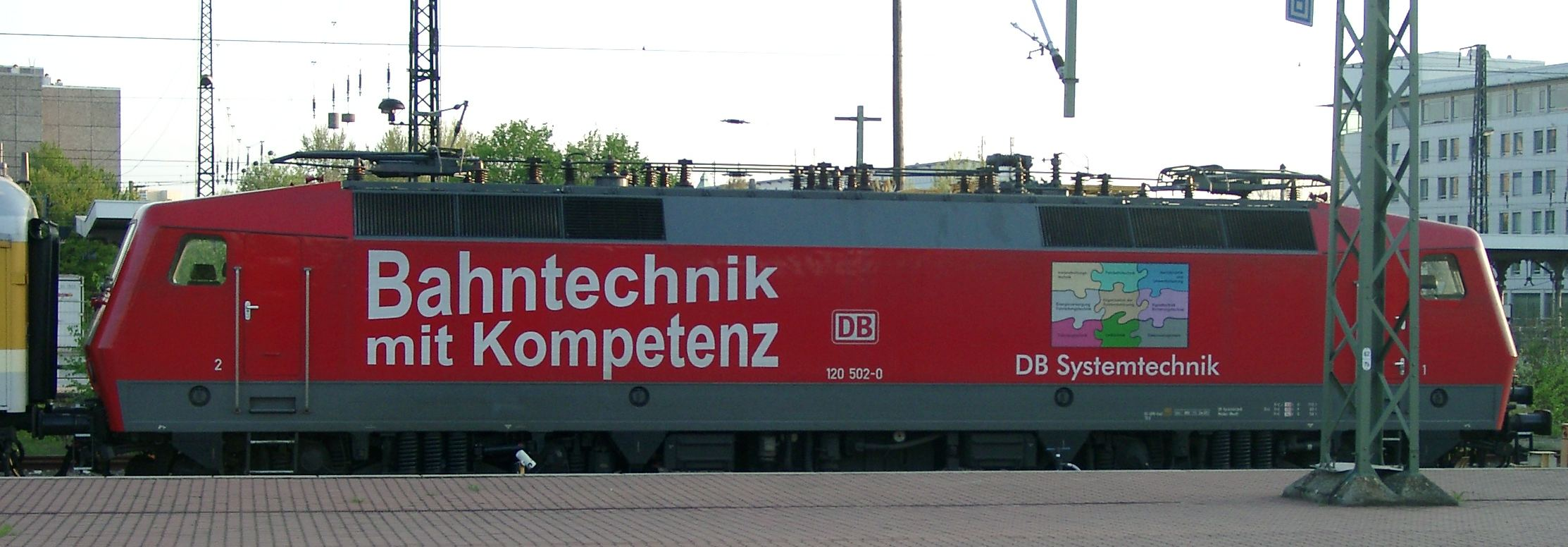
DB-AG BR 120 (DB Systemtechnik), Summer 2006 in Dresden Main Station

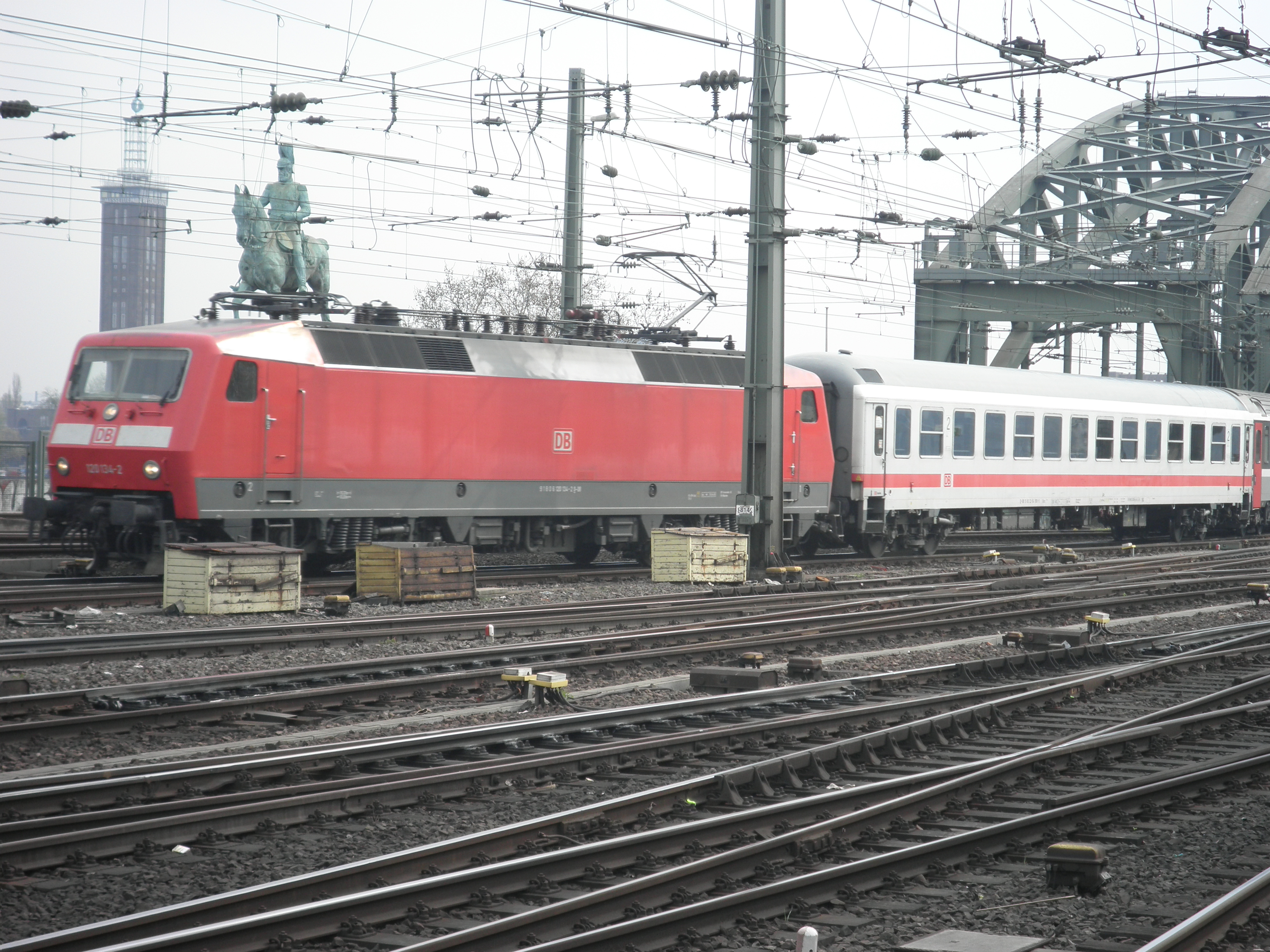
120 134 arrives at Köln Hbf

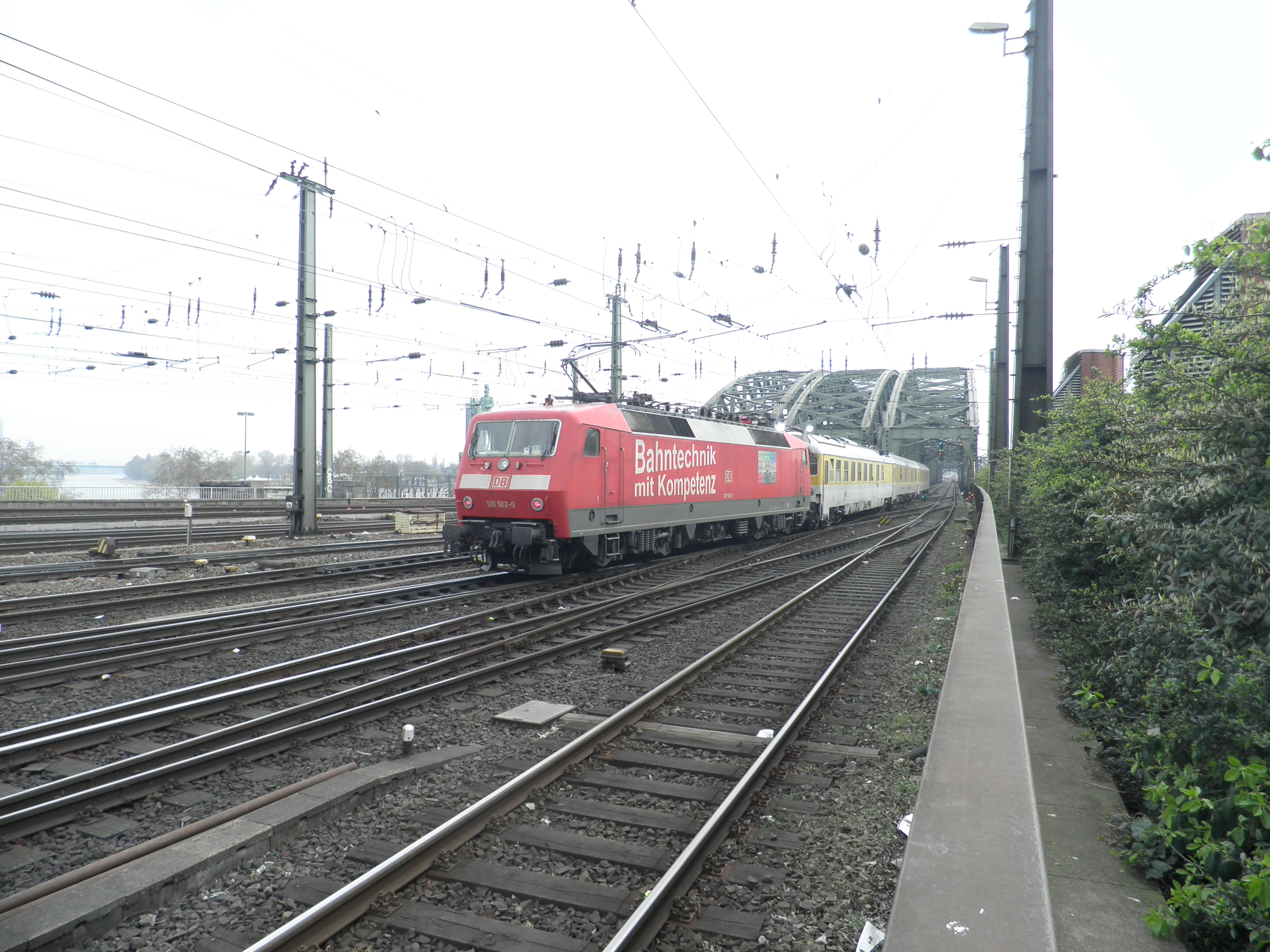
120 502 leaves Köln Hbf on a Bahntechnik train.
