= ICE 1 =

German high-speed train

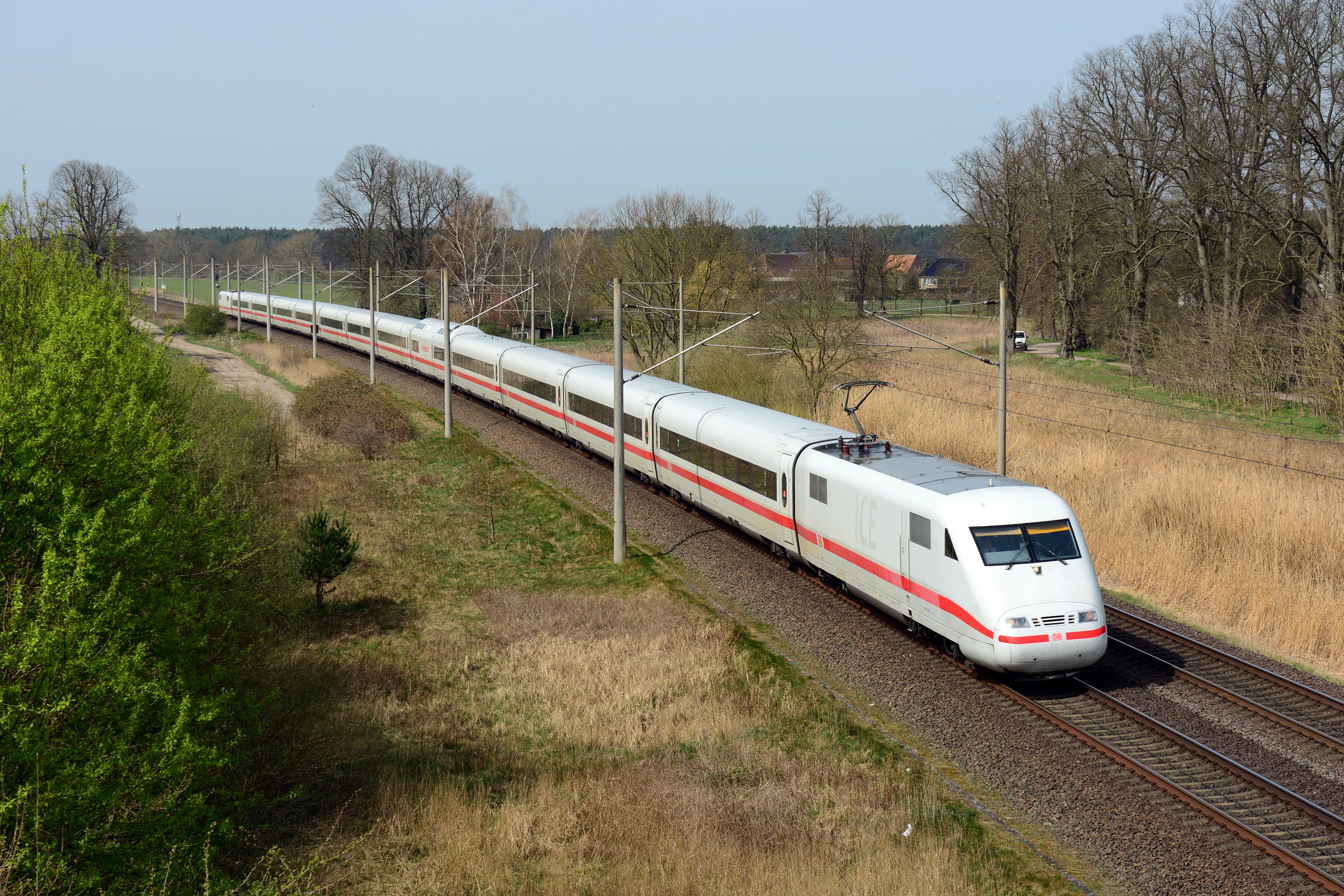
- ICE 1 trainset

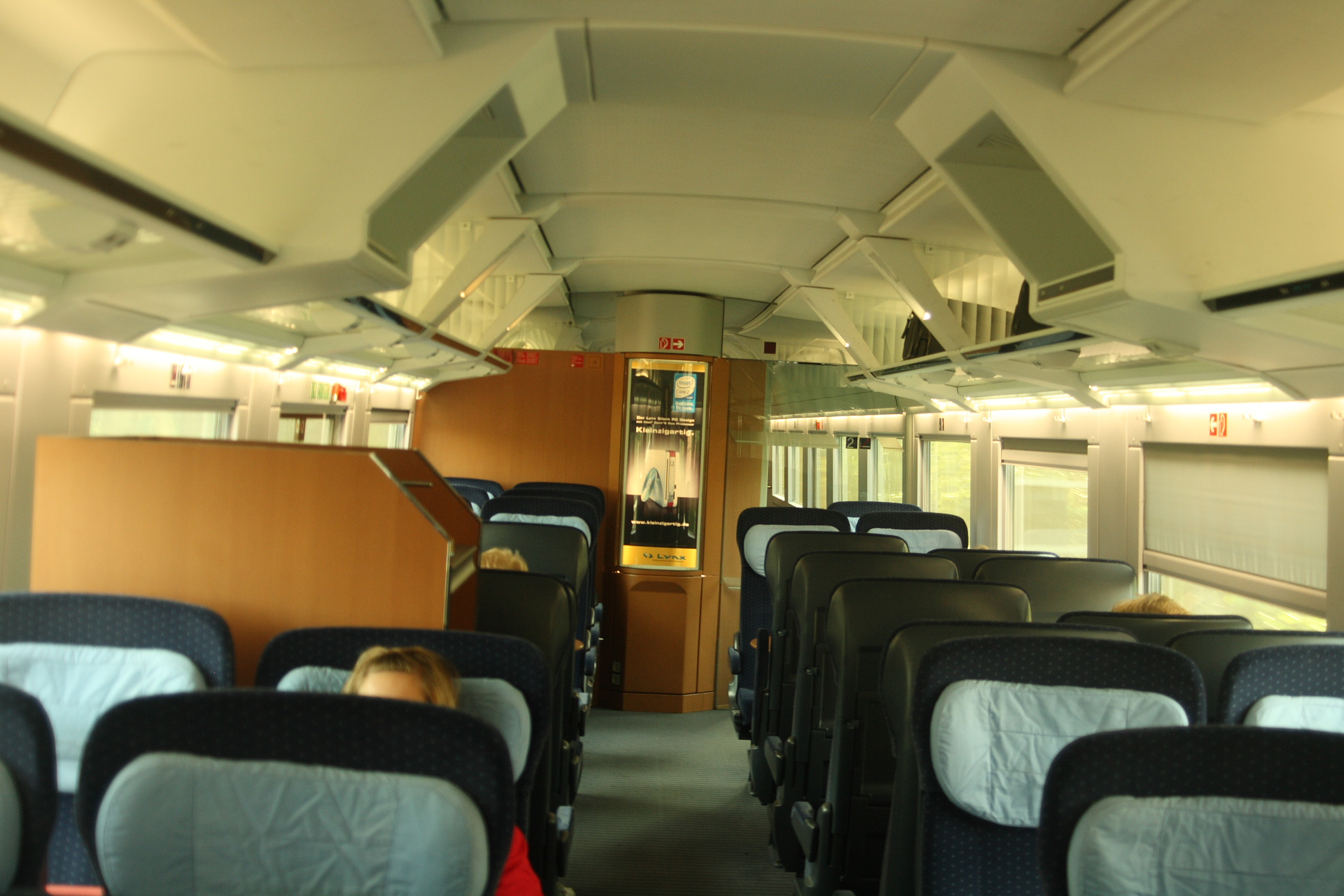
- Second class interior
- Stock type: Electric multiple unit
- Manufacturers: AEG, ABB, Henschel, KraussMaffei, Krupp, Siemens Mobility
- Constructed: 1989–1993
- Refurbished: 2005–2008 (first time); 2019–present (second time)
- Number built: 60
- Formation: 2 power cars, 12 intermediate cars (up to 14 possible); 9 intermediate cars (after the second refurbishment)
- Fleet numbers: 1: Tz 01 to 20; 2: Tz 51 to 71; 3: Tz 72 to 90
- Capacity: 743 seats (12 car trainset)
- Operators: DB Fernverkehr; Amtrak (formerly)
- Depot: Hamburg-Eidelstedt

Specifications
- Maximum speed: 280 km/h (175 mph)
- Weight: 849 t (836 long tons; 936 short tons) (12 car trainset)
- Traction system: As built: 1: ABB 13 SG 01b/13 SG 14a thyristor-VVVF; 2/3: Siemens GTO-VVVF; Currently: ABB BORDLINE CC1500 AC_15kV_M_2400_002A01 IGBT-VVVF
- Power output: 9,600 kW (12,874 hp) (GTO power converters); 7,600 kW (10,192 hp) (IGBT power converters)
- Electric system: Overhead catenary, 15 kV 16.7 Hz AC
- Current collection: Pantograph
- Safety systems: Sifa, PZB90, LZB (all trainsets); Integra-Signum and ETCS (trainsets for service in Switzerland)
- Track gauge: 1,435 mm (4 ft 8 1/2 in) standard gauge

The ICE 1 is the first batch-produced German high-speed train and the first of now several within the Intercity Express family. Revenue service at speeds up to 250 km/h (155 mph) started in 1991, it was raised to 280 km/h (175 mph) in May 1995.

Trainsets consist of two power cars (Class 401) and up to 14 intermediate cars (Classes 801 to 804). Occasionally, power cars and intermediate cars of the ICE 2 are used as well (Classes 402, 805 to 808). Trainsets always operate as a whole train and cars cannot be coupled in regular service.

One of the 60 trainsets (trainset 51) was destroyed in the 1998 Eschede train disaster, which also led to a temporary speed reduction to 250 km/h (155 mph) again. The others were refurbished between 2005 and 2008 and will remain in service for ten to fifteen additional years. Another refurbishment program started in 2019, extending their lifespan to approximately 2030.

== Formation ==
ICE 1 trains consist of two powerheads and 9 to 14 intermediate cars. Because trainsets are not separated in regular service, they can be seen as multiple units from an operational point of view. During the first refurbishment, which was completed in late 2008, trainsets were standardized to 12 intermediate cars.

Until the first refurbishment was completed, there had been three different configurations of ICE 1 trainsets:

- Refurbished trainsets consist of two power cars and 12 intermediate cars. These include four first class cars, including the service car with the conductors' compartment (numbered 9, 11, 12, 14), one restaurant car (8) and seven second class cars (1 to 7). Smoking is prohibited in all cars. Cars 1, 3, 9, 11 and 14 are equipped with cellular repeaters.
- Non-refurbished trainsets for domestic service consisted of three first class cars (11, 12 and 14), seven second class cars (1 to 7), a service car (9) and a restaurant car (10). Car number 7 might have been one of three types: an original second class car of the ICE 1, a second-class-car from the ICE 2 or a first class car from the ICE 1, marked as second class. The first class car number 13 was removed; this was one of two first class cars for smokers, but without the additional equipment of car 14 (video, telephone)
- Non-refurbished trainsets for service into Switzerland consisted of four first class cars (11 to 14) and six second class cars (1 to 6) plus a service and a restaurant (9 and 10)

A train consisting of 14 cars had a length of 410.70 metres (1,347 ft 5 in). Prior to the refurbishment this train would have had 192 seats in first class, 567 seats in second class and 40 seats in the restaurant car plus four in the conference compartment. Two spaces for wheelchairs are available.

Most cars of the ICE 1 offer both compartments and rows of seats, just like the seating in German InterCity cars. Cars at the ends of the trainsets used to be smoking areas. There are "quiet" cars as well as cars that were later equipped with cell phone repeaters. Some seats were designed to turn to face the direction of travel, but this was never used in revenue service.

== Power cars (Class 401) ==
DB Class 401 (ICE 1 Power Car)
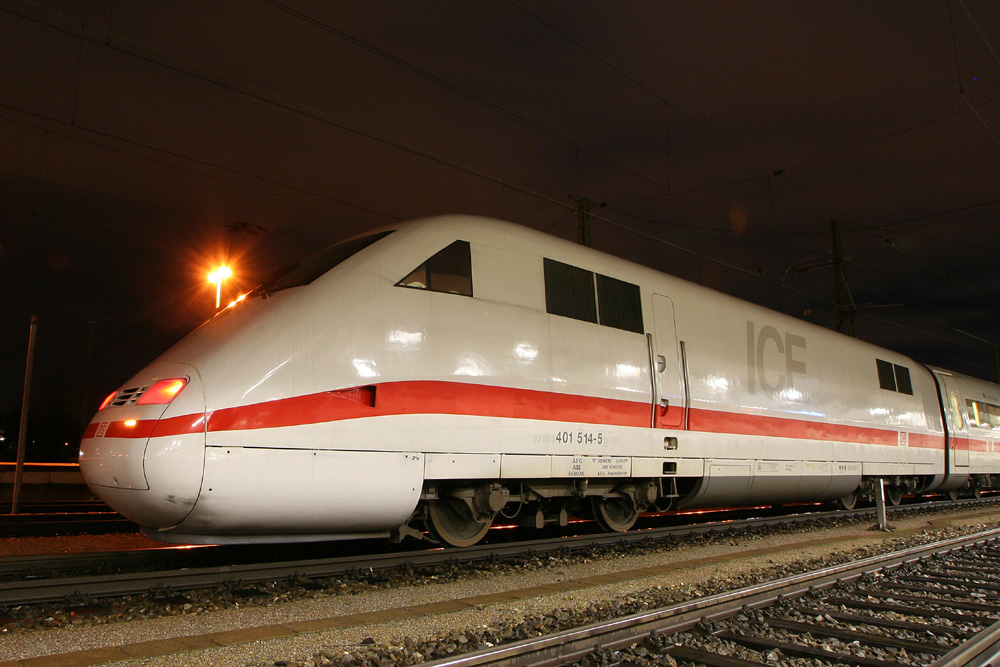
- ICE 1 power car at Nuremberg
Type and origin
- Power type: Electric (3-phase)
- Builder: Krauss-Maffei (body); Krupp, Henschel; AEG, ABB, Siemens (electrics)
- Build date: 1989—1993
- Total produced: 120
Specifications
- Configuration
  - UIC: Bo'Bo'
- Gauge: 1,435 mm (4 ft 8 1/2 in)
- Wheel diameter: 1,040 mm (40.945 in)
- Length: 20.56 m (67 ft 5 in)
- Loco weight: 77.5 t (76.3 long tons; 85.4 short tons)
- Electric system/s: Overhead catenary, 15 kV 16.7 Hz AC
- Current pickup: Pantograph
- Traction motors: 1: 4× AEG BAZ 7096/4; 2/3: 4× Siemens 1TB2427-0GA02
- Transmission: AEG type 2LB 3100-1A
- Gear ratio: 2.586
Performance figures
- Maximum speed: 280 km/h (175 mph)
- Power output: Thyristors: 2× 1,900 kW (2,548 hp); GTO: 2× 3,000 kW (4,023 hp); IGBT: 2,400 kW (3,218 hp)
- Tractive effort: 200 kN (44,962 lb_{f})
Career
- Numbers: 1: 401 001 to 401 020; 401 501 to 401 520; 2/3: 401 051 to 401 090; 401 551 to 401 590

The class 401 power car includes the cab and the engine compartment. Besides the driver's seat and controls, the cab features a second seat and several controls behind the seats. The engine compartment has a central corridor with door at both ends as well as a door on each side of the power car.

Both bogies are powered by four forced-air cooled traction motors each. Each motor has a continuous power rating of 1,250 kW (1,680 hp), the UIC power rating of the vehicle is 4,800 kW (6,400 hp), and the largest starting tractive effort 200 kN (45,000 lb_{f}). The drive system uses asynchronous three-phase AC motors pioneered in the Henschel-BBC DE 2500 locomotives as well as the InterCityExperimental. These motors are fitted between bogies and frame using pneumatics that are electronically adjusted depending on the current speed ("Umschaltbare Antriebsmasse UmAn," i.e., switchable drive mass). The power cars are directly derived from the Class 120 locomotives.

At the time they entered into service, the power cars were considered exceptionally advanced technology. Each power car alone had ten computer systems. Displays on both sides of the driver's console allowed, for example, controlling operating conditions or entering failure notifications, that were automatically reported to the maintenance facility via radio.

While the InterCityExperimental's power cars were higher than the intermediate cars, both heights would be adjusted for the ICE 1 series. A significant change to the predecessor is the pressure-sealed cab.

=== First series: traction equipment using thyristors ===
Power cars 001 to 020 and 501 to 520 each had two power converters using conventional thyristors from ABB (type 13 SG 01b) and asynchronous traction motors from AEG (type BAZ 7096/4).

=== Second and third series: traction equipment using GTO's ===
All other power cars (051 to 090 and 551 to 591) had GTO power converters from Siemens (SIBAS 16), which were responsible for the distinctive "melody" that could be heard when the power car is brought up to speed. These power cars use asynchronous traction motors from Siemens (type 1TB2427-0GA02).

Both versions have a gear ratio of 75/29 ≈ 2.586. Power cars with thyristor-based power converters weigh about 80.4 t (79.1 long tons; 88.6 short tons), those with GTO power converters two and a half tons less.

The power converters are rated to 7.6 MW (10,200 hp). The GTO version's transformers output 5.2 MW (7,000 hp): 4.5 MW (6,000 hp) for traction and 700 kW (940 hp) for heating, air-conditioning and auxiliary circuits.

=== IGBT refit ===
In October 2007, Deutsche Bahn tendered refitting two power cars with IGBT power converters instead of thyristors. The refit was awarded to ABB, who equipped them with BORDLINE CC1500_AC_15kV_M_2400_002A01 (three-level) traction converters. After field testing, 36 more power cars with thyristor converters were refitted with IGBT's.

In October 2021, it was announced that DB had ordered ABB to refit all 76 power cars with GTO traction converters with IGBT's, and ABB equipped them with BORDLINE CC1500_AC_15kV_M_2400_002B01 (three-level) traction converters. The traction motors and gearboxes were not replaced during this refit. After this batch of refits, only two power cars are left with GTO's: 401 006 and 401 051.

=== Multiple working ===
On the front, power cars feature a Scharfenberg coupler underneath a cover. Contrary to all other variants of ICE trains, the coupler of ICE 1 power cars is not used in regular service, as ICE 1 trains are never operated in multiple traction during revenue service, exclusively running with one trainset.

The ICE 2 power cars (Class 402) are compatible to the intermediate cars of the ICE 1 and are used with ICE 1 trains when necessary. Two ICE 2 power cars were ordered specifically for powering ICE 1 trains (402 045 and 402 046).

Power cars for service into Switzerland are equipped with a second pantograph matching Swiss specifications and the Swiss Integra-Signum safety system as well as ETCS. The other power cars are prepared for fitting a second pantograph.

Usually the power car 401 0xx is coupled to the first class cars, while the power car 401 5xx is coupled to the second class end of the train.

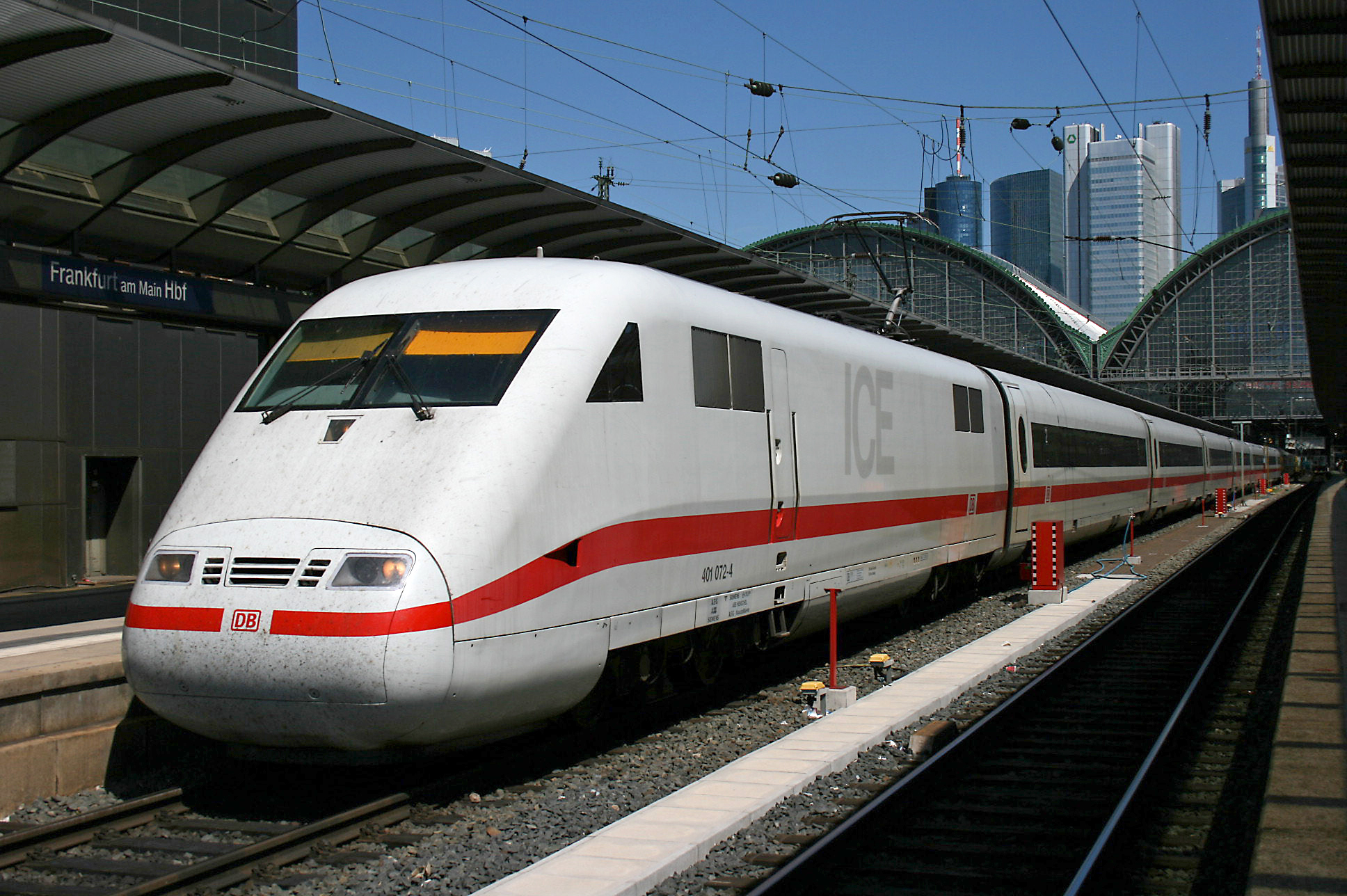
ICE Power Car 401 072-4 in Frankfurt am Main

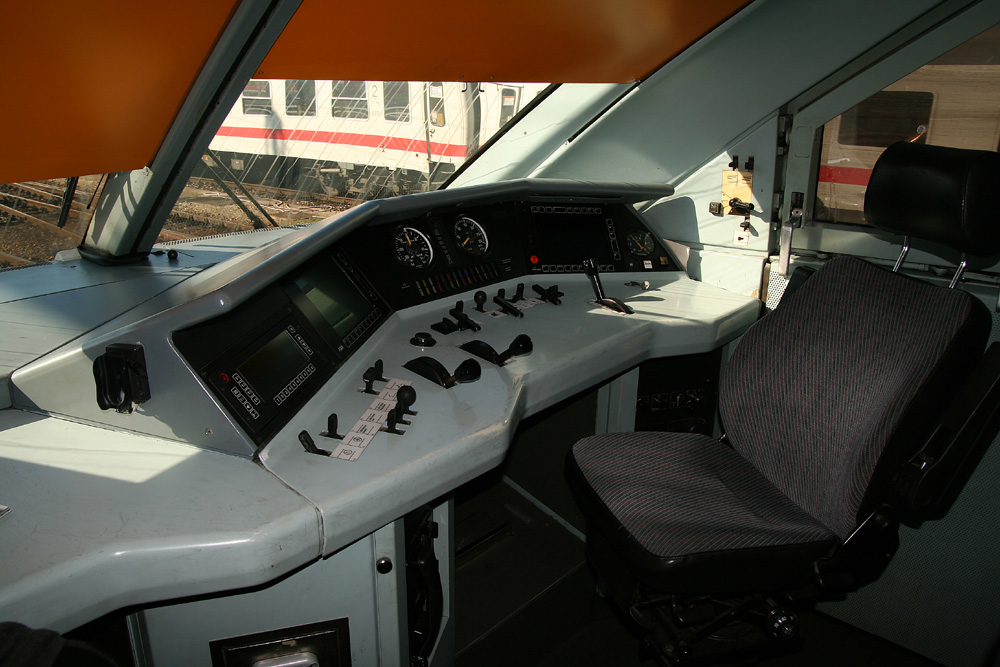
Cab of a Class 401 Power Car

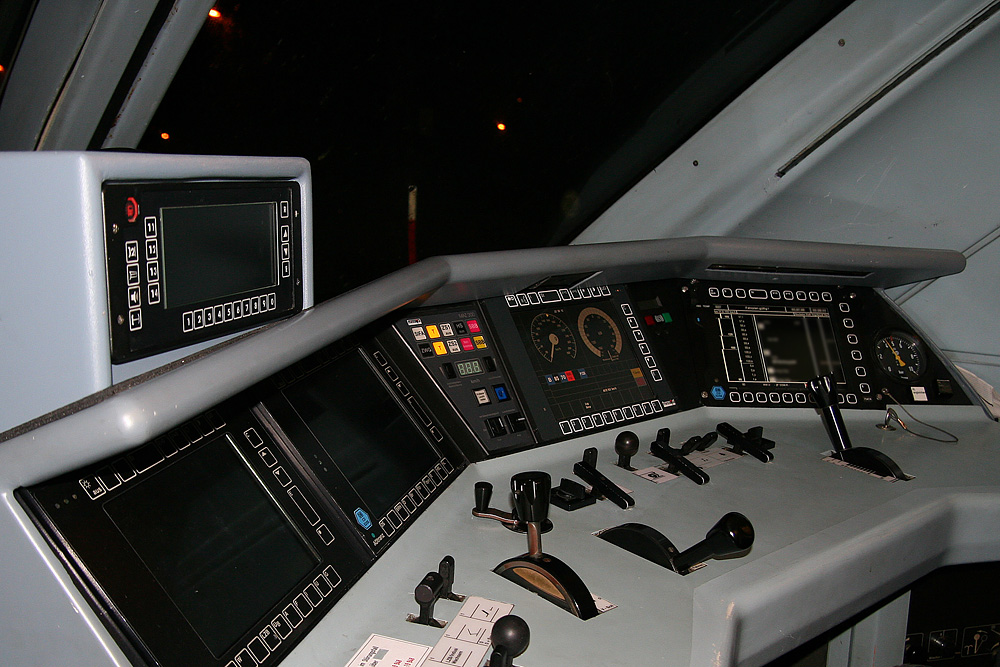
Modernised cab featuring ETCS displays

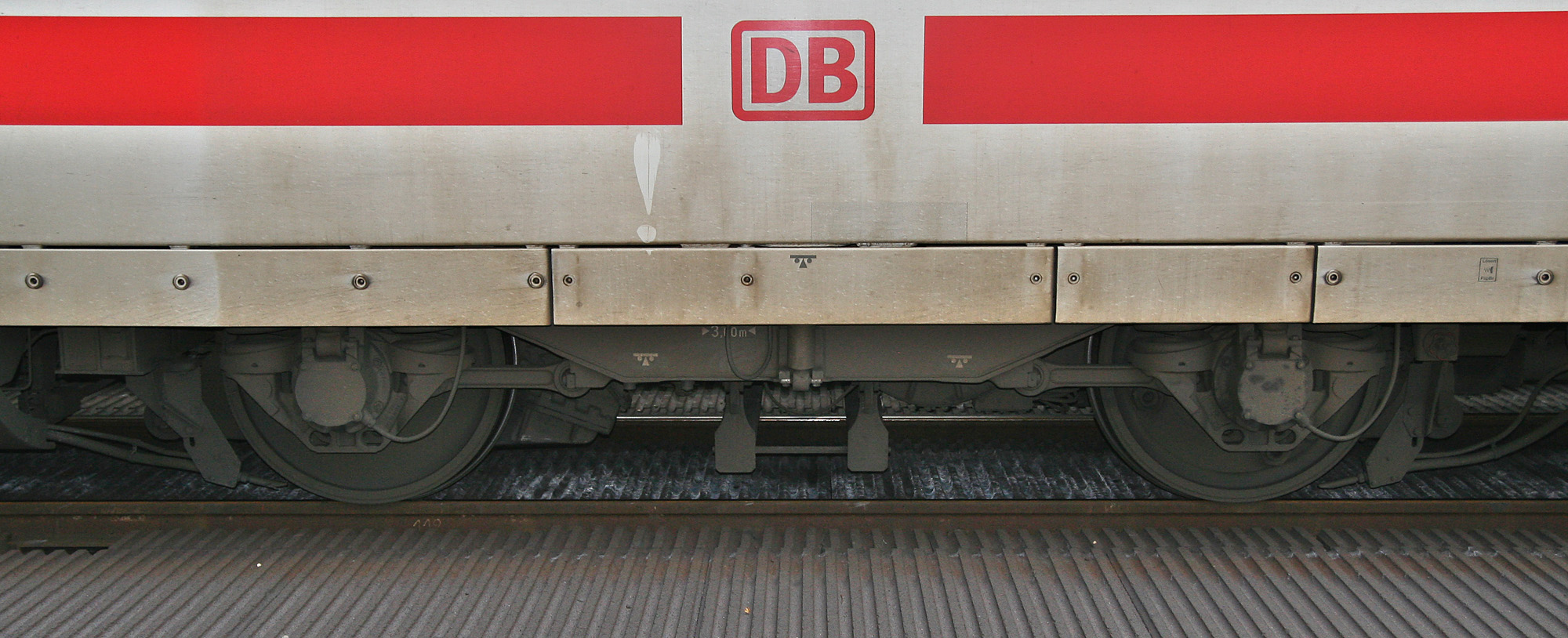
Closeup of a bogie

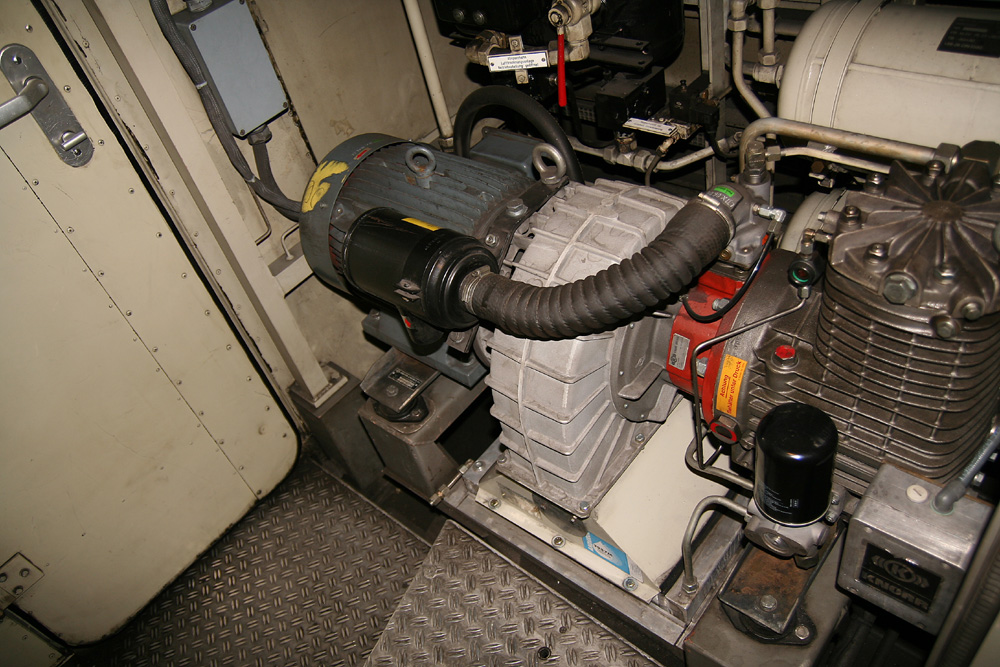
Air compressor inside the engine compartment

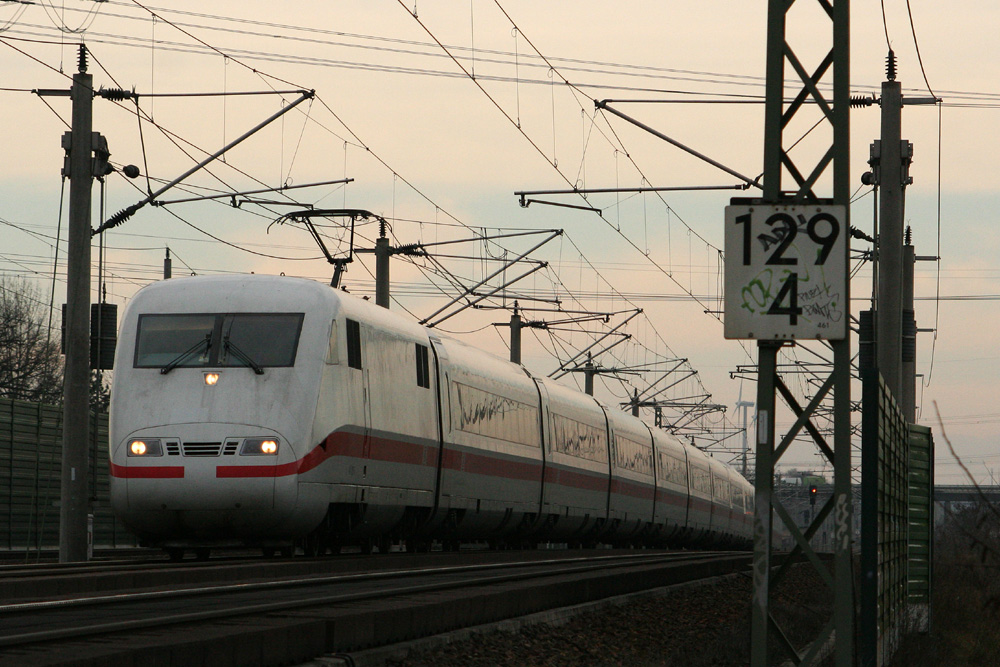
Power car and intermediate cars with distinctive "bend", 1.8m above the rails

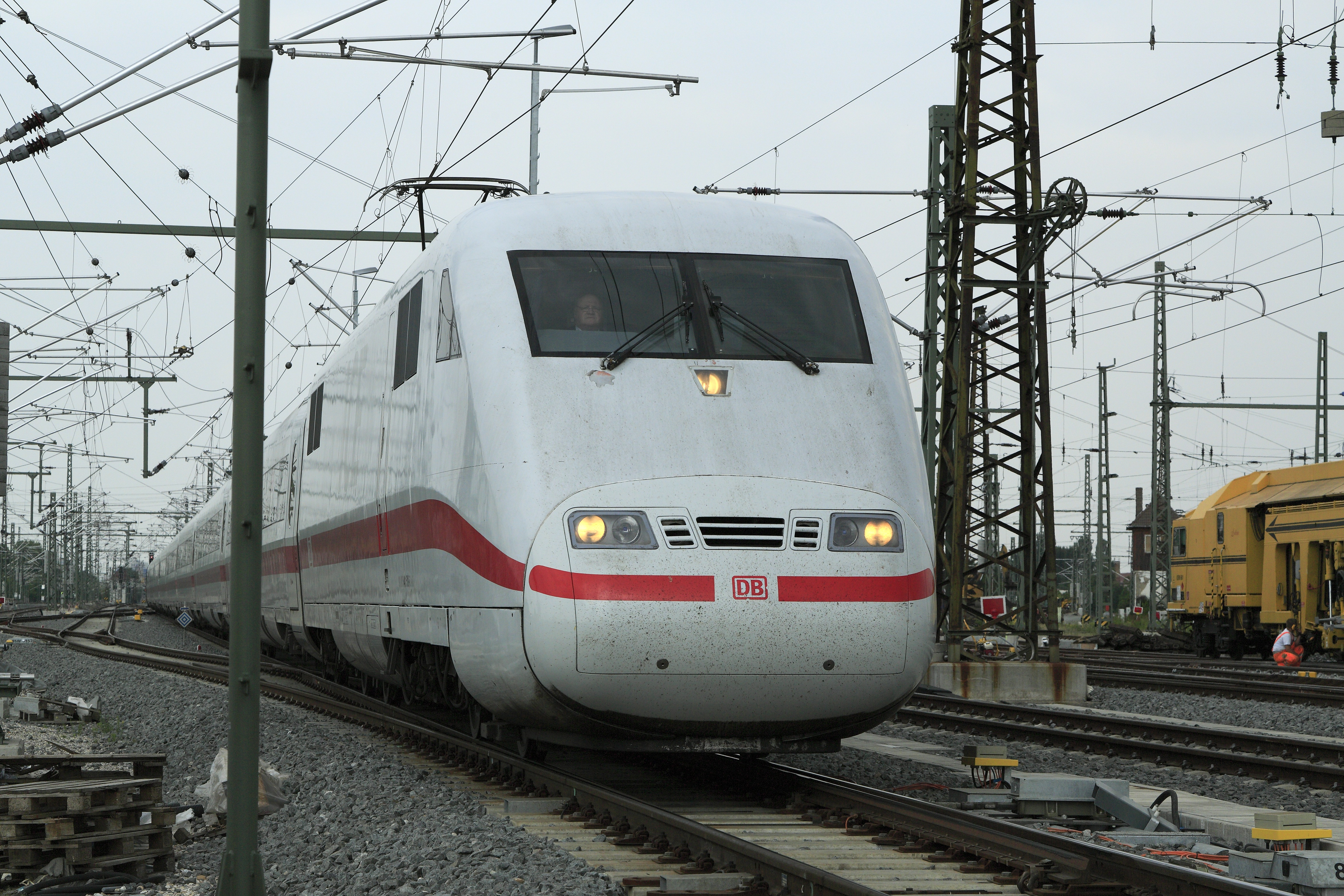
Aerodynamic front. The coupler cover can be seen in the lower part.

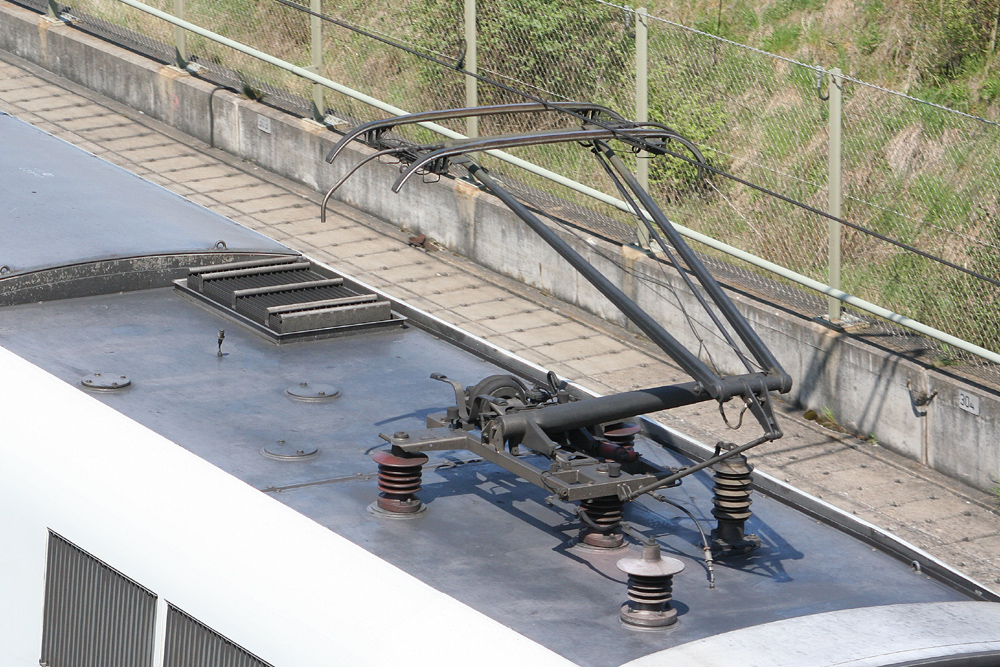
ICE 1 Pantograph

== Intermediate cars ==
=== First Class Intermediate Car (Class 801) ===
First Class Intermediate Car
- Manufacturers: LHB, Duewag, Waggon Union, MHB, MBB
- Capacity: 53 (post-refurbishment); 48 (pre-refurbishment)

Specifications
- Car body construction: aluminium-silicon alloy
- Car length: 26.4 m (86 ft 7 in)
- Width: 3.02 m (9 ft 11 in)
- Height: 3.84 m (12 ft 7 in)
- Floor height: 1.21 m (4 ft 0 in)
- Weight: 52.8 t (52.0 long tons; 58.2 short tons) (pre-refurbishment, incl. 800 L (176.0 imp gal; 211.3 US gal) water)

When delivered, these cars were divided into two main areas. One area had rows of seats in a 2+1 arrangement further divided by a coat rack in the middle of the area. Seats were spaced 1,114 mm (43.86 in) apart and the aisle was 636 mm (25.04 in) wide. The other area comprised three compartments with five seats each. Between the compartments and the doors were the toilet, three display cabinets, lockers and several trash cans.

The first order of ICE 1 trains (41 trainsets) included 105 cars of this type.

=== First Class Intermediate Car with Special Equipment (Class 801.8) ===
These cars are the same as the class 801 car, except for a C-Netz telephone, that was placed between the toilet and the first compartment.

The first order of ICE 1 trains included 41 cars of this type.

=== Second Class Intermediate Car (Class 802) ===
Second Class Intermediate Car
- Manufacturers: LHB, Duewag, Waggon Union, MHB, MBB
- Capacity: 71 (post-refurbishment); 66 (pre-refurbishment)

Specifications
- Car body construction: aluminium-silicon alloy
- Car length: 26.4 m (86 ft 7 in)
- Width: 3.02 m (9 ft 11 in)
- Height: 3.84 m (12 ft 7 in)
- Floor height: 1.21 m (4 ft 0 in)
- Weight: 53.6 t (52.8 long tons; 59.1 short tons) incl. 1 t (0.98 long tons; 1.1 short tons) of water and supplies (before refurbishment)

These cars are divided into two main areas as well. One part comprises two toilets and four passenger compartments with six seats each. The other part is fitted with rows of seats in a 2+2 arrangement, divided in two halves by a coat rack. Prior to the refurbishment, this area had six tables with seats arranged on both sides. This has been reduced to four in favor of additional seats.

Seats were spaced 1,020 mm (40.16 in) apart before the refurbishment, and the backrests could be reclined up to 40 degrees. Each car was designed in one of three different sets of colors for carpets and seat covers.

Some units, running as car number 1 (smokers' car second class), had one compartment refitted for storing luggage containers for the AIRail Service. This was used for airline passengers travelling between Stuttgart and Frankfurt Airport. These special compartments were removed during the refurbishment.

The first order of ICE 1 trains (41 trainsets) included 246 cars of this type.

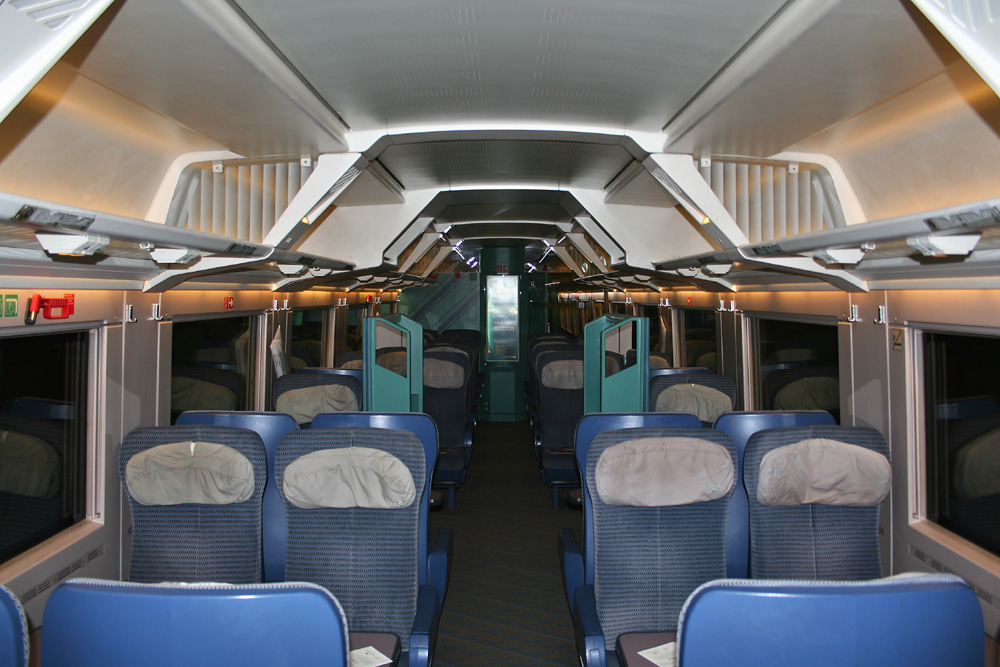
Pre-refurbishment: Two coat racks divide the part with tables from the rows of seats. The aisle to the right leads to four compartments.

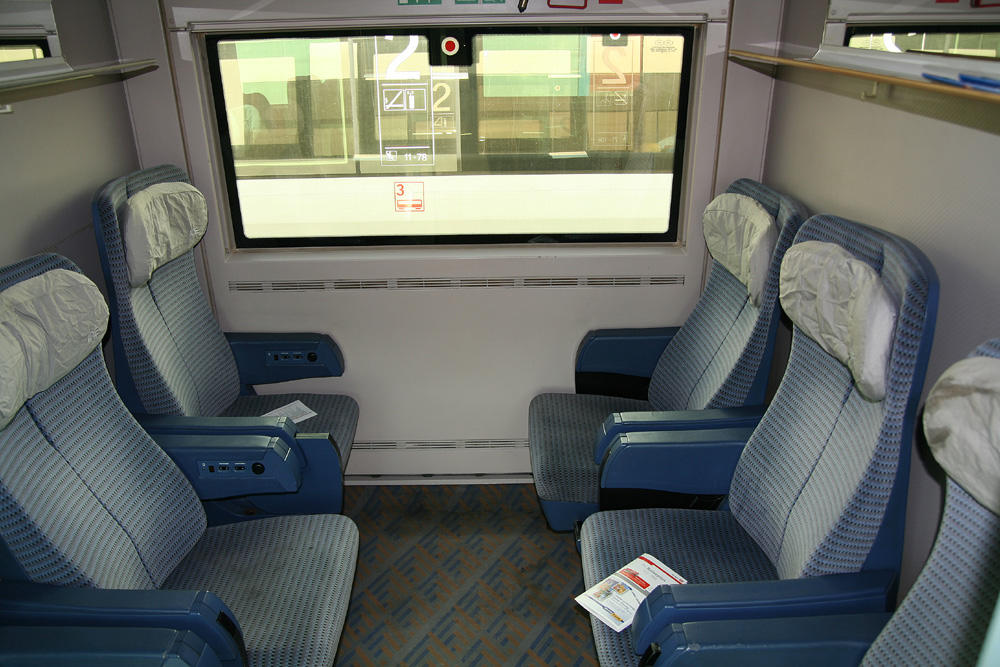
Pre-refurbishment: Compartment with six seats

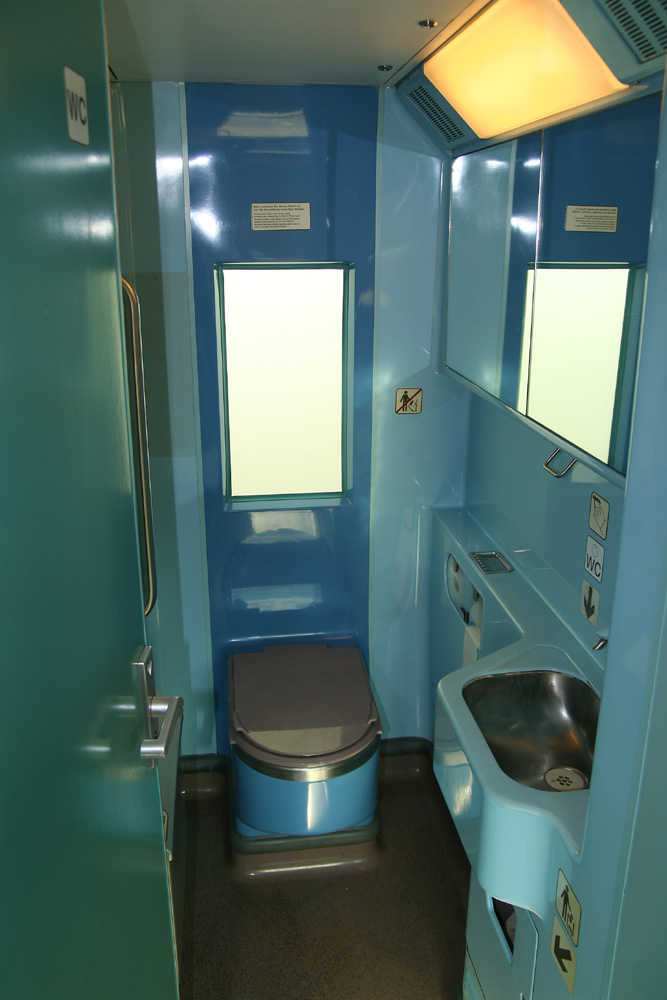
Pre-refurbishment: toilet

=== Second Class Car with Special Configuration (Class 802.9) ===
The order for the ICE 2 trainsets in October 1993 included additional cars to be coupled into ICE 1 trainsets. 24 second class cars (class 806.9) and one first class car (class 805.9) were collectively designated class 802.9 and coupled into ICE 1 trainsets as car number 7, after two years of passenger service had shown that second class capacity was too low.

=== Service Car (Class 803) ===
Service Car
- Manufacturers: LHB, Duewag, Waggon Union, MHB, MBB
- Capacity: 35 (post-refurbishment); 45 (pre-refurbishment)

Specifications
- Car body construction: aluminium-silicon alloy
- Car length: 26.4 m (86 ft 7 in)
- Width: 3.02 m (9 ft 11 in)
- Height: 3.84 m (12 ft 7 in)
- Floor height: 1.21 m (4 ft 0 in)

Prior to the refurbishment, the class 803 service car had 39 second class seats, two wheelchair spaces and a conference compartment with four seats. Additionally, there is the conductors' compartment, one compartment for employees of the restaurant car and a wheelchair-accessible toilet including a changing table. The doors are 100 millimeters (3.94 inches) wider compared to other cars to improve accessibility for wheelchairs. There is an additional toilet reserved for employees of the restaurant car to ensure food safety.

The second class seats were arranged just like in the usual second class intermediate cars. Originally, these cars also held the train's second phone booth.

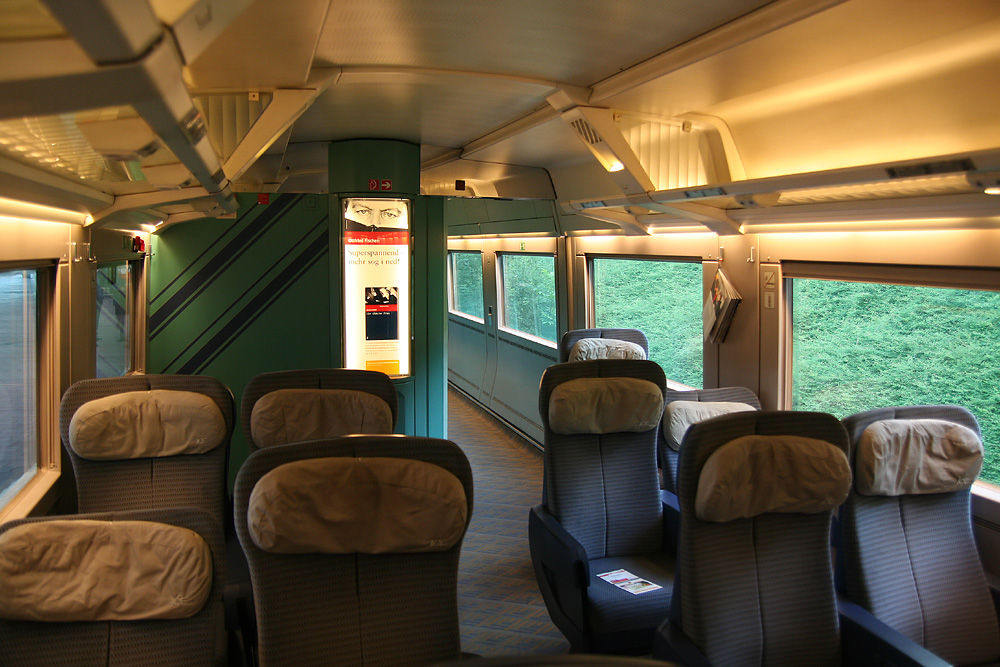
Interior pre-refurbishment. Two wheelchair spaces on the left, in front of the wall.

At the time of commissioning, the conference compartment was equipped with a large table, four freely movable chairs, an electronic typewriter, a fax machine, a telephone and power sockets. It could be used with a reservation of at least three seats. Originally, first-class tickets were necessary. If there were no reservations in the conference compartment, it could be used at the head conductor's discretion. In 1992, demand was high: the conference compartments were booked 8197 times. A year later, that number dropped to 4400. Before the refurbishment program, the train's only power sockets for passengers were located in the conference compartment.

The train's information displays are controlled from the conductor's compartment, which is also where announcements are usually recorded.

The first order of ICE 1 trains (41 trainsets) included 41 cars of this type.

=== Restaurant Car (Class 804) ===
Restaurant Car
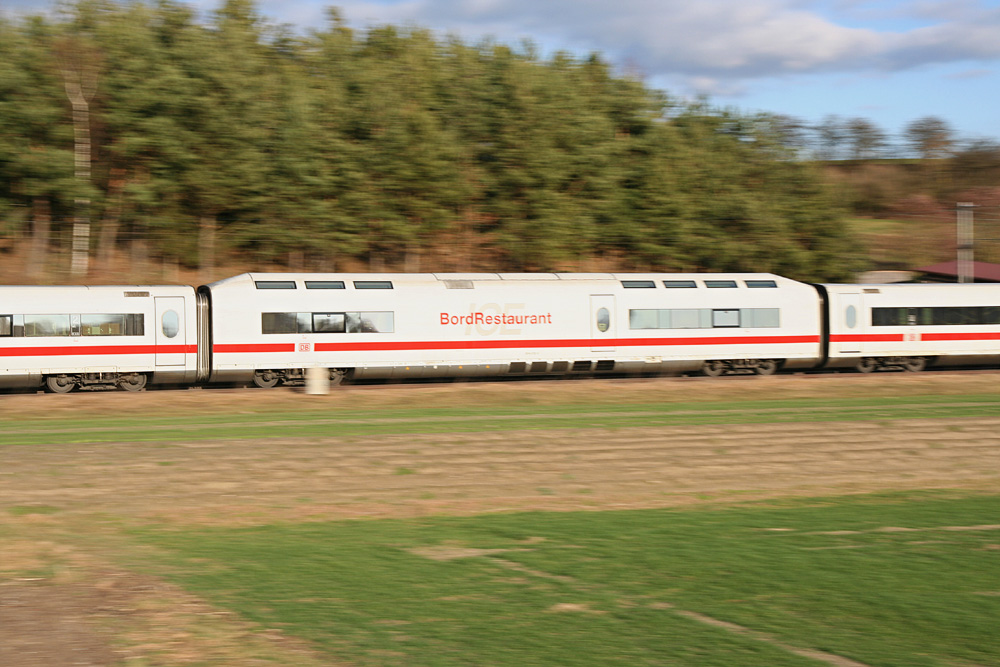
- Manufacturers: LHB, Duewag, Waggon Union, MHB, MBB
- Number in service: 59
- Capacity: 24 (Restaurant area); 16 + 10 standees (Bistro area)

Specifications
- Car body construction: aluminium-silicon alloy
- Car length: 26.4 m (86 ft 7 in)
- Width: 3.02 m (9 ft 11 in)
- Height: 4.295 m (14 ft 1.1 in)
- Floor height: 1.21 m (4 ft 0 in)

The restaurant car (class 804, also referred to as Bordrestaurant, former spelling BordRestaurant) has a total of 40 seats. On the side facing the first class cars is a dining area, where guests are served at eight tables with 24 seats in a 2+1 arrangement. The central part of the car comprises the galley that is connected to a counter facing the BordBistro area (formerly referred to as Bord-Treff "on-board meeting point"). This self-service area is designed for 16 seated and 10 standing guests.

The restaurant car can easily be recognized by its raised roof, which is 450 mm (17.72 in) higher than the rest of the train. This was necessary in order for all the kitchen equipment to fit into the car. Unlike all other intermediate cars, the restaurant car has no sideways doors for passengers to enter or exit the car from the platform. There is, however, a door in the kitchen area that can only be opened from inside.

In the refurbishment program, the galley was redesigned. It now includes a microwave oven, storage space for containers and a new coffeemaker.

There is one restaurant car in every ICE 1 trainset. Originally, it was planned to serve meals at the tables of the neighboring first-class car as well, if all seats in the restaurant car were taken.

== History ==
The trains are based on the experimental vehicle InterCityExperimental which was completed in 1985. Project planning of the series had already started the year before. Specification and a project schedule were completed in 1985, but because of the lack of practical experience it was considered provisional. After many details were changed, Deutsche Bundesbahn published tender documents on 2 January 1986.

=== Procurement ===
A first series of 41 trainsets was eventually ordered after lengthy discussion between the Bundesbahn and the Federal Ministry of Transport.

The development of the power cars was tendered in March 1986, with development of the intermediate cars in June. By the end of the year, all contracts were awarded.

At the delivery ceremony of the first Class 120 locomotive on 13 January 1987, Werner Dollinger, the federal minister for transport, said: "I hereby empower the board of the Deutsche Bundesbahn to order the first ten units of the series version of the ICE from the industry at once. Financing is assured." ("Hiermit ermächtigte ich den Vorstand der Deutschen Bundesbahn, sofort zehn Exemplare der Serienausführung des ICE bei der Industrie in Auftrag zu geben. Die Finanzierung ist gesichert.") Prior to that statement there had been speculation that the federal government would not provide funding for the trains that were necessary to effectively use the high-speed lines that were designed for speeds of 250 km/h (155 mph). When the high-speed lines were to be opened in 1991, plans called for 40 to 50 ICE trainsets ready for service. The power output of the power cars was designed for trains with 14 intermediate cars at a speed of 250 km/h (155 mph), while bogies and brakes were designed to 280 km/h (175 mph).

Using a letter of intent, Bundesbahn ordered 82 power cars in September 1987 and 482 intermediate car in July 1988 (according to a different source, 492 intermediate cars). The Federal Ministry of Transport approved of the order in July 1988. The contracts were officially awarded to the consortiums on 20 January (power cars) and 20 February 1989 (intermediate cars). Delivery of the first power car was planned for August 1989, the first intermediate car was to be delivered in April 1990, and testing of the trains was to start in spring of 1990.

The purchase price of the first 41 trainsets ordered was about 1.8 billion DM, about 1.2 billion DM of which was for the electric equipment. The Bundesbahn claims to have reduced the price by about 300 million DM through negotiations. One power car cost 8.7 million, a restaurant car four million, a service car three million and a regular intermediate car 2.7 million DM.

In July 1990, Bundesbahn ordered 19 additional trainsets of two power cars and twelve intermediate cars (including one service car) for another billion DM. These 19 trainsets were approved for service in Switzerland and made services past Basel via Bern to Interlaken and to Zürich possible. Delivery of these units started in the fall of 1991.

A further development of the ICE 1 into a multi-system train for international services was specified as ICE-M. While this concept was later implemented in the ICE 3M, while plans for a fast freight train for piece goods based on the ICE 1 (called ICE-G) were shelved.

==== Power Cars ====
Production of the power cars began in the fall of 1988, based just on a letter of intent, however, the production contract became legally binding much later. The first 82 power cars received fleet numbers 401 001 to 020, 401 051 to 071, 401 501 to 520 and 401 551 to 571.

When production of the power cars started in the fall of 1988, bogies and other parts were already in production. The skeletons of the bodies were built at Krauss-Maffei at Munich. Further construction of the bodies was shared in equal parts between Krauss-Maffei, Krupp (Essen) and Thyssen-Henschel (Kassel). A consortium of ABB (BBC), AEG and Siemens supplied the electrical equipment.

The first power car of the serial production was officially delivered to Bundesbahn on 26 September 1989 at Krauss-Maffei's factory in Munich. Numerous guests of honor were present for the ceremony, including the federal minister of transport Friedrich Zimmermann, the federal minister of research Heinz Riesenhuber and Bundesbahn CEO Reiner Gohlke. Delivery of the first 41 trainsets was planned to be completed by April 1991, while in early 1989 complete delivery had been planned for September 1991. Commissioning of the first vehicle began shortly after delivery, with one power car being delivered every week. After some initial delays, delivery was back on schedule by spring 1990. By the end of May 1990, 35 power cars had been delivered. In the spring of 1990, 401 015 and 401 515 were delivered, which were the first power cars equipped with additional pantographs for service in Switzerland.

The first presentation of the ICE outside Europe was the Technogerma exposition at Seoul from 27 February to 9 March 1991. Power car 401 555 and one intermediate car were brought there by ship.

==== Intermediate Cars ====
Development and production of the intermediate cars was lead-managed by LHB (Salzgitter). Main partners were Duewag (Krefeld-Uerdingen), Waggon Union (Berlin), MHB and MBB Verkehrstechnik (Donauwörth). MAN and several smaller companies were involved as well. Preparations for production began in mid-1988, actual production started one year later. The bodies were a lightweight construction made from large extruded profiles of an aluminium-silicon alloy, the base plan was built as a hollow chamber profile.

The first car (of class 802) was delivered by MBB at Donauwörth on 2 July 1990. The first cars of classes 801 and 803 were delivered by Duewag at Krefeld-Uerdingen on 13 August. The first restaurant cars followed in the fall of the same year.

=== Commissioning ===
When the first ICE 1 power cars were commissioned in late 1989, the intermediate cars were not yet available. Instead, they were coupled to retired couchette cars (type yl) that were homologated for 200 km/h (125 mph). These were fitted with special couplings for compatibility to the power cars. Usually, Class 110 locomotives served as Angstlok as well as for pulling the train on the return trip. For braking tests, the locos were sometimes coupled between two power cars, with match wagons on both sides. The test runs usually started at the Opladen repair workshop and used lines in the vicinity. Fast runs at up to 200 km/h (125 mph) were to Bielefeld and Bremen. Because of time pressure, some power cars were used for tests that had not yet been accepted by Bundesbahn. For longer test runs, two "dummy trainsets" comprising eleven couchette cars and ten InterCity cars (type Bm 235) respectively were used to replace the missing intermediate cars.

Besides the test runs, the first power cars were used for various other purposes. 401 006 was sent to the Bundesbahn school at Munich-Aubing for three weeks in April 1990. Later the same month 401 005 was used for fine-tuning the new depot at Hamburg-Eidelstedt to the trains. Starting 22 May, 401 504 and 401 008 were used to train drivers for acceptance runs at Nuremberg. At the same time, 401 503 was sent to Nuremberg for a test disassembly. In early June 1990, 401 010 was sent to the environmental test chamber at the Austrian Research and Test Center Arsenal.

When the first intermediate cars became available, the first complete ICE 1 trains underwent trials between Fulda and Würzburg on the Hanover-Würzburg high-speed rail line, where they reached speeds of 310 km/h (195 mph).

=== Distinctive features ===
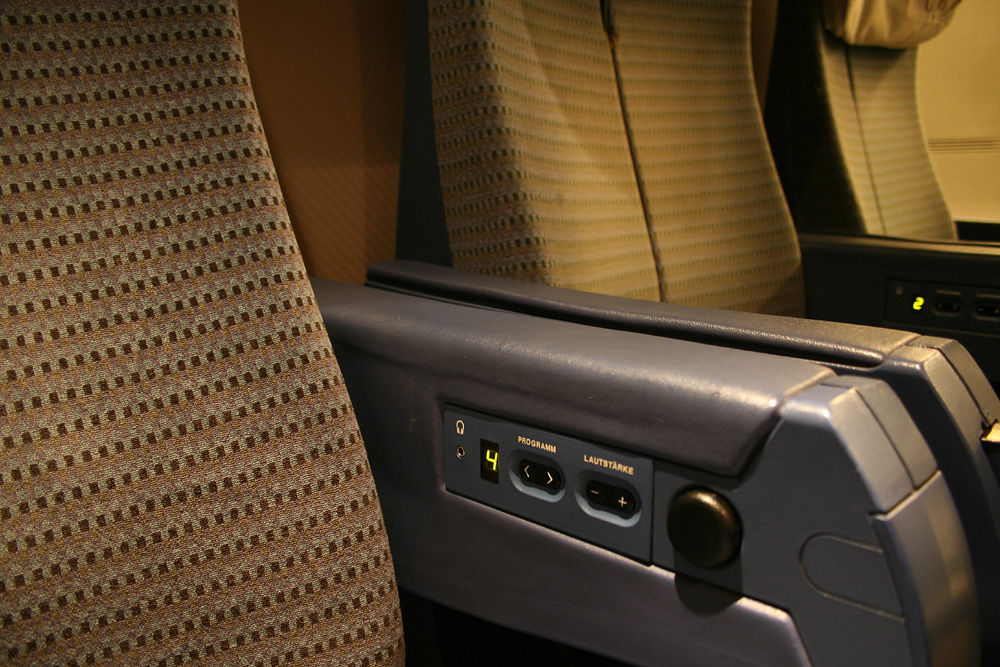
Controls for reclining the backrest (large black button) and the audio system at a seat inside an ICE 1 prior to the refurbishment

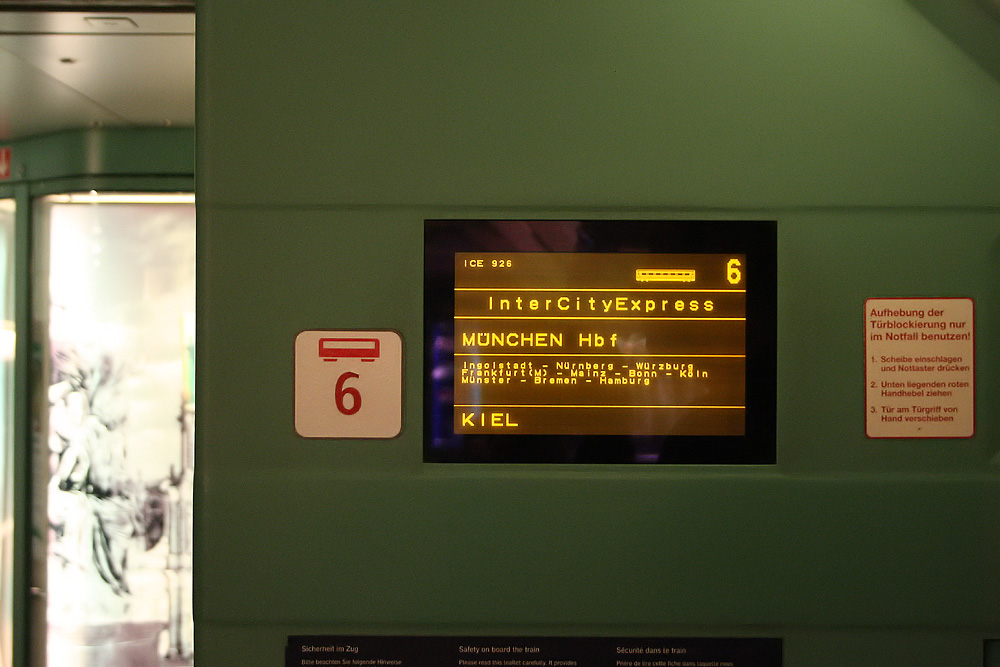
Information display next to a door

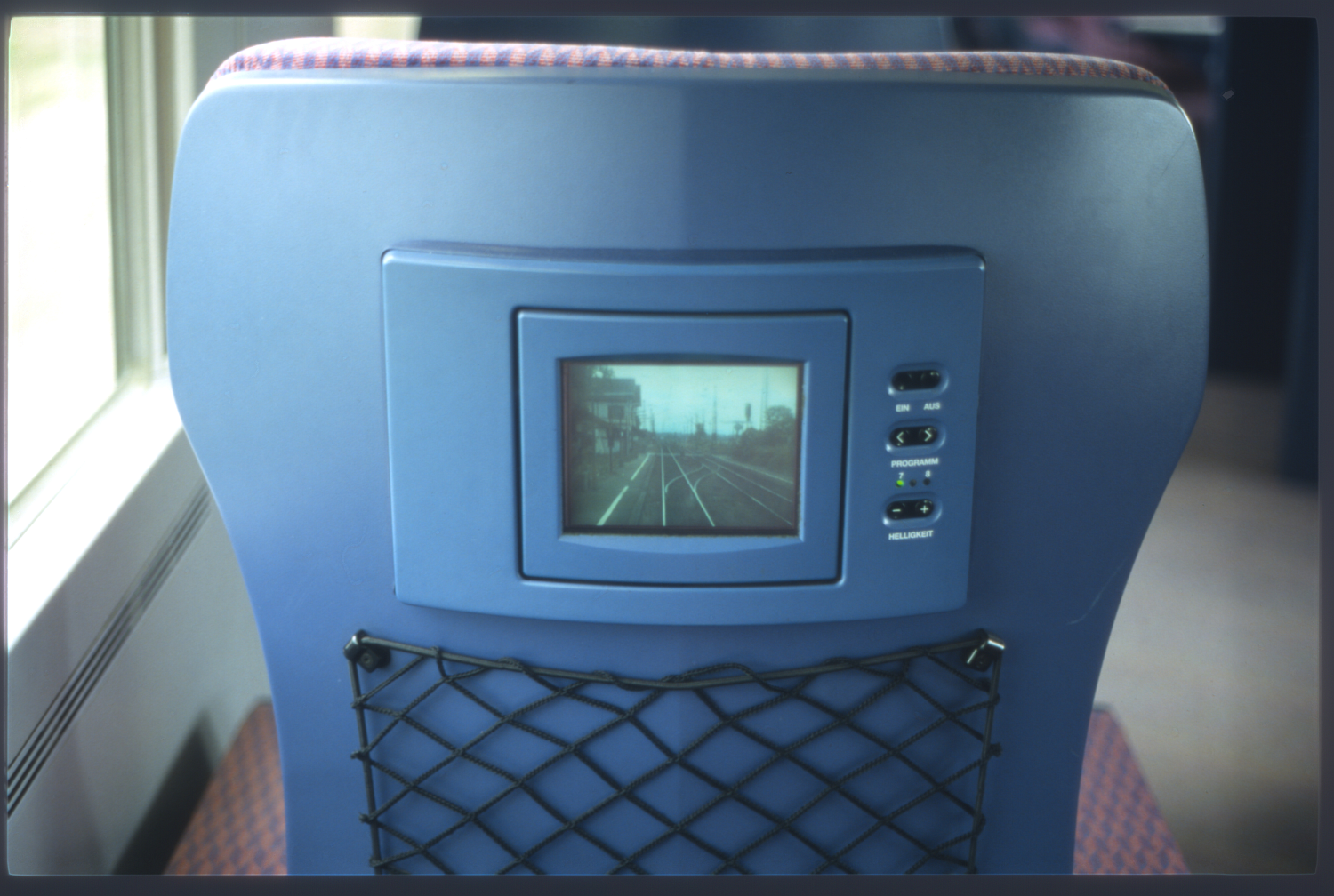
Video display on first class seat

Compared to the InterCity, the new train had several distinctive features. Besides the increased top speed (250 km/h (155 mph) instead of 200 km/h (125 mph)), traveling comfort was improved significantly. The ICE 1's cars are 20 centimeters wider than the newest IC cars at the time, the number of seats per second class car was reduced from 88 to 66 while the car length remained the same.

All passenger cars were air conditioned. The passages between the cars were wide and without doors, the seat pitch of 102 cm (40.2 in) (second class) and 111 cm (43.7 in) (first class) was larger than on any other German train. Furthermore, the doors were unusually wide and featured steps that deployed automatically when the doors were opened to make entry as convenient as possible, and the glass doors dividing the two major areas of the intermediate cars were opened by proximity sensors. The ICE 1 was the first German train in which smokers and non-smokers were separated not into different parts of the same car, but to different cars altogether.

Each seat featured a standard 3.5 mm audio jack with controls for switching between eight channels: three radio programs from public broadcasters, three programs played from Compact Disc and two audio channels for video programs. In both classes, some seats featured video monitors in the backrests of the seats. Luggage could be stored both above and below the seats. The main part of the car was divided by a coat rack. Every seat had its own reading lamp and information monitors in the entrance areas switched between displaying the train's route and the current speed.

Because they were conceived in the 1980s, the trainsets had no power sockets available to travellers except for the conference compartment prior to the refurbishment. The few power sockets were placed in order to operate cleaning equipment and were usually disabled during the journey.

=== Start of operation ===
Service trials of the first ICE 1 trainsets started in the fall of 1990, about a year later than originally planned. On 28 February 1991 the ICE 1 was officially presented to the press at Fulda, on 8 March the press was invited for a run from Hamburg to Ulm and back.

The first regularly scheduled ICE train, Münchner Kindl, departed from Hamburg-Altona in Hamburg at 5.53 am on 2 June 1991. For the inauguration of the ICE system, ICE 1 trainsets operated on one ICE line from Hamburg to Munich, via Hanover, Fulda, Frankfurt, Stuttgart and Augsburg, at hourly intervals. This coincided with the inauguration of the first two German high-speed rail lines Mannheim-Stuttgart and Hanover-Würzburg, which required 18 trainsets. At the time of the inauguration a total of 25 trainsets were available. Originally, the trainsets were made up of 13 intermediate cars: four first class, restaurant car, service car and seven cars second class.

In 1991 and 1992, ICE 1 trainsets gradually took over additional services between Hamburg/Bremen and Munich. On 31 May 1992, this IC service was officially transferred to the ICE. On the same day, the ICE Sprinter service was introduced.

In 1992 and 1993, the IC service from Hamburg to Basel via Frankfurt and Karlsruhe was gradually transferred to the ICE 1. Starting 27 September 1992, some trains continued into Switzerland to Zürich for the first time.

Since 23 May 1993, some ICE services have started in Berlin instead of Hamburg or Bremen. With three lines operating, the planned requirements of rolling stock increased to 48 trainsets. On 28 May 1995, some services were extended to Interlaken, on 24 May 1998 an ICE service to Vienna was introduced.

=== Further development ===
On 12 August 1995, the Chinese head of state Jiang Zemin travelled on board the ICE from Ludwigsburg (near Stuttgart) of Rolandseck (near Bonn). For this purpose, a special trainset had been coupled from two power cars and six intermediate cars, one of which had been converted to a palace car. The Guest of the State was accompanied by the Federal Minister of Transport Matthias Wissmann, DB chief of passenger operations Klaus Daubertshäuser and several board members of AEG and Siemens. The train reached a maximum speed of 280 km/h (175 mph). A visit to the cab that was scheduled for five minutes was extended to about 30 minutes by the Guest of the State. The companies involved hoped to sell ICE technology for the 1,300 km (807.8 mi) Beijing to Shanghai connection.

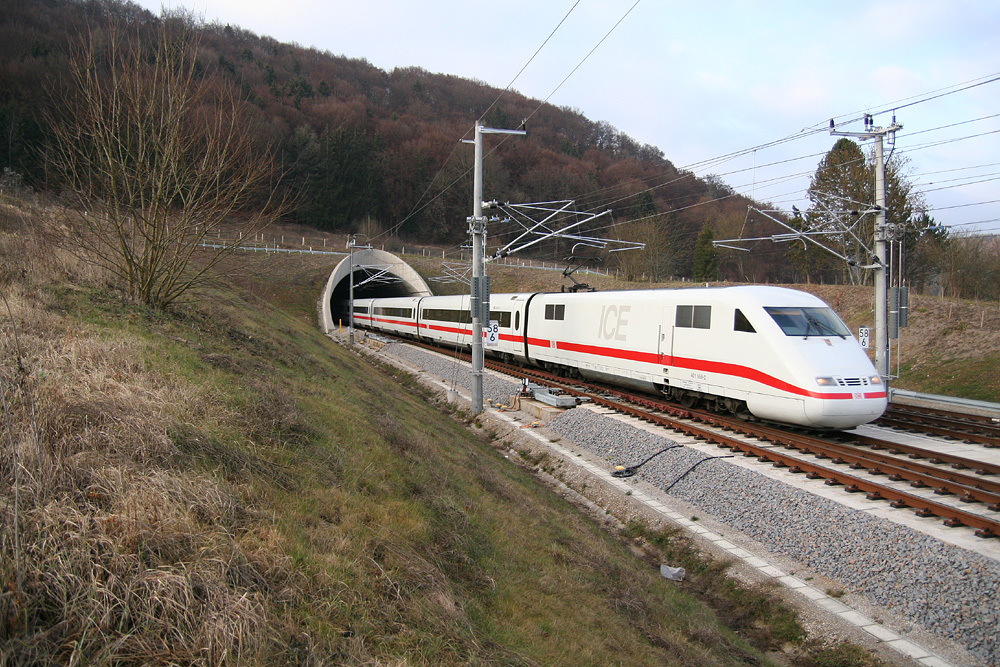
ICE 1 outside the Schellenbergtunnel on the Nuremberg–Munich high-speed railway. Some ICE 1 trains are allowed to travel the line at 280 km/h (175 mph).

Starting 29 May 1995, ICE 1 trains were allowed to travel at their top speed of 280 km/h (175 mph). This was used on ICE line 3 (Hamburg–Frankfurt–Basel) in conjunction with other measures to cut travel time by a total of 17 minutes. This significantly improved the trains' connections for Switzerland's synchronized timetable. In 1998, the top speed was again lowered to 250 km/h (155 mph). Since mid-2006, single ICE 1 services on the Nuremberg–Ingolstadt high-speed railway travel at 280 km/h (175 mph). In 2008, the ICE 1 service ICE 783 uses its top speed on the Hanover–Würzburg line.

Since 1 September 2007, smoking has been prohibited in all of Deutsche Bahn's trains. Smoking areas had gradually been reduced to both cars at the very ends of the ICE 1 trainsets (cars 1 and 14). Until 30 September 2006, smoking was allowed in the Bistro area of the restaurant car. The restaurant area had always been smoke-free. Starting in late 2005, smoking in the first class cars of refurbished trains had already been limited to the three compartments of car 14.

=== First refurbishment ===
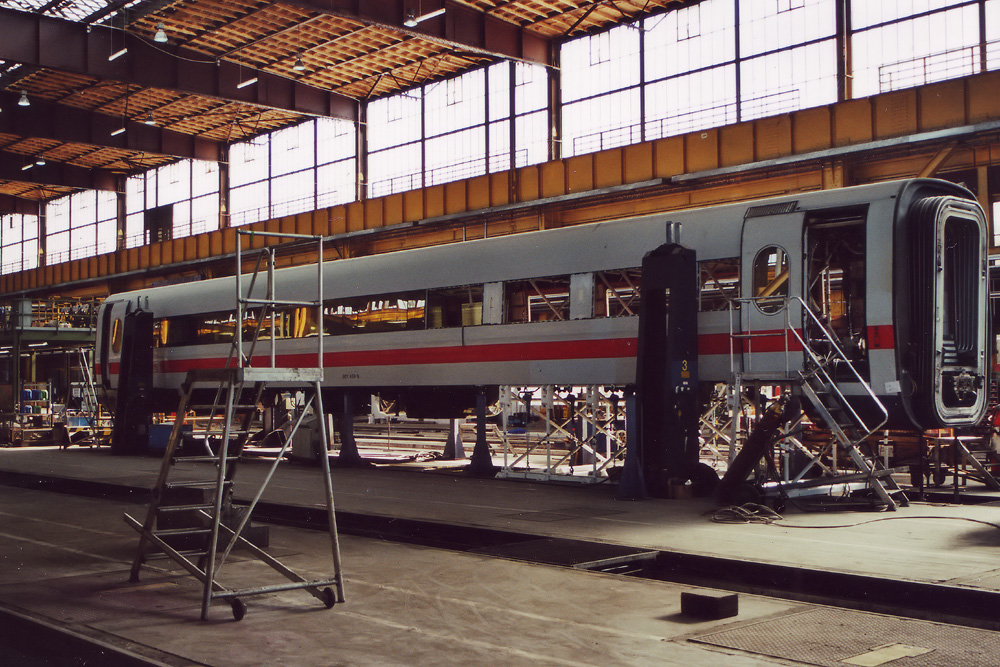
Prototype for the refurbishment of ICE 1 intermediate cars at the Nuremberg facility (2005)

By mid-2005, each ICE 1 trainset had travelled 6.5 to 7.9 million kilometers and had been in revenue service for up to 14 years. In the summer of 2005 a refurbishment program was started, referred to by Deutsche Bahn as "Redesign". It was planned to toughen up all trainsets for another 10 to 15 years of service at the Nuremberg main railway workshop completing in December 2008.

For the refurbishment, trainsets were taken out of service for five weeks (25 work days). Refurbishing a single ICE 1 trainset costs about three million Euro, a fraction of the cost of buying new trains. The entire program cost about 180 million Euro.

About 80 percent of the materials are re-used, including 16,000 tons of steel and 1,200 tons of copper from the power cars' traction motors. Compared to buying new trains, the program saves about 1.3 billion Euro. About 35,000 tons of carbon dioxide emissions were avoided as well as about 500,000 tons of industrial waste.

After several weeks of testing, the first refurbished ICE 1 (trainset 11 "Nürnberg") went back into service on 5 August 2005. By March 2006, eleven trainsets had been refurbished, by February 2007 half the fleet (30 trainsets), by June 2007 37 of the 59 trainsets. In 2005, nine trainsets were refurbished, in 2006 and 2007 20 each. Until the end of 2007, two trains underwent refurbishment at the same time. The remaining trainsets were refurbished one-by-one.

The refurbishment program uses the full capacity of the Nuremberg workshop with 320 jobs.

In each of the 708 intermediate cars, about 3500 parts were removed, processed or replaced and reinstalled. This included 42,000 seats, 40,000 square meters of carpets, 5000 tables, 42,000 reservation displays and 11,000 window shades. The interior design was adapted to the newer ICE generations.

Interior changes included:

- new colors, brighter lights
- panelling from teak wood, similar to the second-generation ICE 3 interior
- reduction to the seat pitch in second class to 920 mm. This allows the installation of 60 additional seats per trainset. Because the window arrangement was not changed, this resulted in some "wall window seats": Window seats without windows next to them.
- power sockets on the seats and luggage racks in the center of the car. For supplying the power sockets, four additional power circuits were installed in each car.

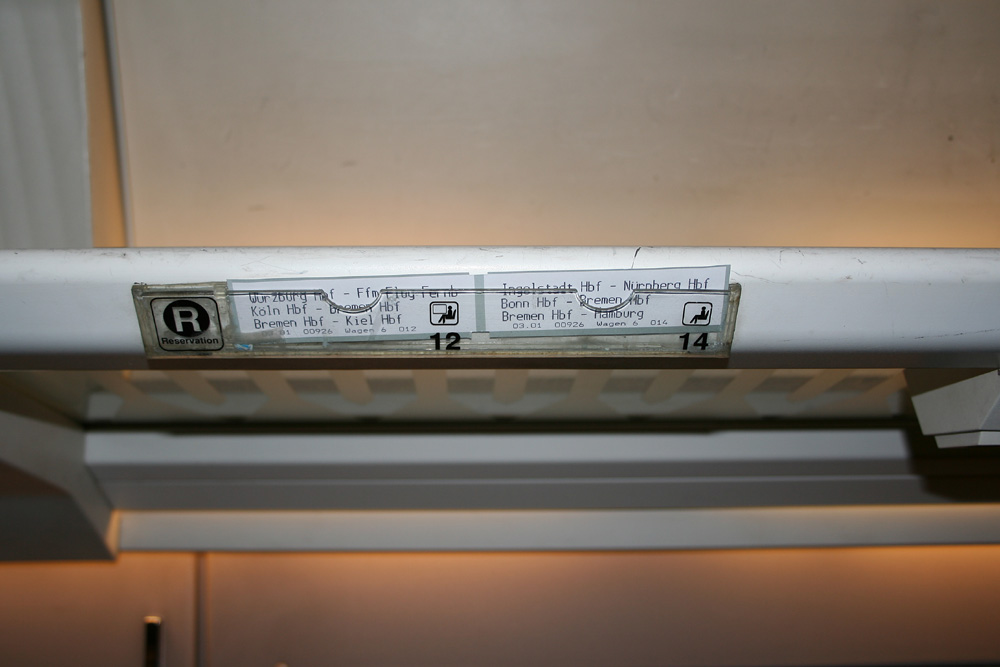
Since refurbishment, seat reservations have been shown on small displays instead of pieces of paper.

- passenger information displays were modernized and displays indicating reserved seats were installed.
- new design of the restaurant car, which now resembles the restaurant cars of the first series ICE T
- the accessible toilet now features a panic button. Buttons to call for assistance have been installed at the wheelchair spaces.
- reduced maximum power due to set IGBT instead of GTO.

During the refurbishment, the audio and video systems were removed as well as the phone booths, the foot-rests in second class, the terminals for timetable information and the buttons in first class that were used to call the conductor. The backrests in second class compartments do not recline any more, those in second class row seats only by a limited amount. The seat cushion can still be moved to the front by about five centimeters.

The power cars received new bogie frames and a new power supply for the air conditioning. The power cars of trainsets 01 to 20 were refitted with GTO power converters. Smaller measures included diagnosis and subsequent repair of the driver's brake valve, the installation of new relays into some safety circuits and some software changes.

After the refurbishment, all trainsets were coupled to a standardized combination of 12 intermediate cars. During the refurbishment, seats that differ between both versions cannot be reserved.

=== Field tests ===
Starting in mid-1993, a newly developed bogie with air suspension was tested in a first class intermediate car (801 088-6) in scheduled service. The two-year trial was to prove that the bogie that was homologated for 300 km/h was ready to go into production for the ICE 2.

Since 1995, two ICE 1 trainsets have been used as so-called idea trains ("Ideenzüge") on services from Hamburg to Basel and Stuttgart. These trainsets were used to test cellular repeaters, returnable bottles in the restaurant car and different concepts for in-train Internet access. Later these trainsets were used in regular ICE service, without tests being conducted. During the refurbishment, the additional installations were removed.

For the early-morning service Ernst Barlach from Hamburg to Munich, two compartments in cars 1 and 7 were reserved for the storage of skis in early 1995. In each compartment, racks for 28 pairs of skis were installed. This service was offered at no extra cost, reservation of storage space was not possible. From 13 January to 23 March 1996, the same service was offered in a compartment of car 5 of ICE trains 585 and 588 from Hamburg to Garmisch-Partenkirchen and back. On a pair of ICE trains between Berlin Zoo and Interlaken this was offered as well on specific dates from mid-December 1995 to mid-April 1996.

In 1995, some ICE 1 cars were used to field-test new air conditioning units that used air as cooling agent and therefore did not require special refrigerants. These units were later installed in the ICE 3.

In the late 1990s, trainset 13 had ICE 2 power cars and a new intermediate car with traction motors for testing the distributed traction concept. The train was referred to as ICE D.

=== ICE train North America tour ===
In June 1993, an eight-car trainset was shipped from Bremerhaven to the United States. The trainset included two power cars 401 084 and 584, one first class car, two second class cars, one restaurant car, and one service car. Starting in April 1993. the train had been adapted to service on the Northeast Corridor. Changes included adaptations to the 11 kV, 25 Hz electrification system and changed wheel profiles.

The trainset did presentation runs to 25 cities in the US and Canada. Starting 4 October, it was used in Metroliner service between Washington, D.C., and New York City for two months. On other lines the train was pulled by diesel locomotives, specifically the experimental F69PHAC.

Siemens and AEG-Westinghouse hoped to win a contract by Amtrak for 26 trainsets for a fast Boston–New York–Washington service that would eventually become the Acela. Had the bid been won, the trainsets would have been built at five plants of the GM Electro-Motive Division in the United States.

Other attempts to sell ICE 1 technology outside Germany remained unsuccessful as well. In 1993/1994 AES and Siemens offered the ICE to Taiwan, hoping to win an order for 45 trainsets. The Taiwanese Minister for Transport Liu Chao-shiuan tested the ICE in the summer of 1993, while in Germany.

=== Swiss speed record ===
On 8 November 2007, trainset 89, which had been shortened to about 200 m (656 ft 2 in), set a Swiss land speed record for railed vehicles during trial runs for the ETCS cab signalling inside the Lötschberg Base Tunnel. The trainset reached 288 km/h (179 mph). The trainset had a modified pantograph, but two of the eight traction motors had been disabled.

=== Second refurbishment ===
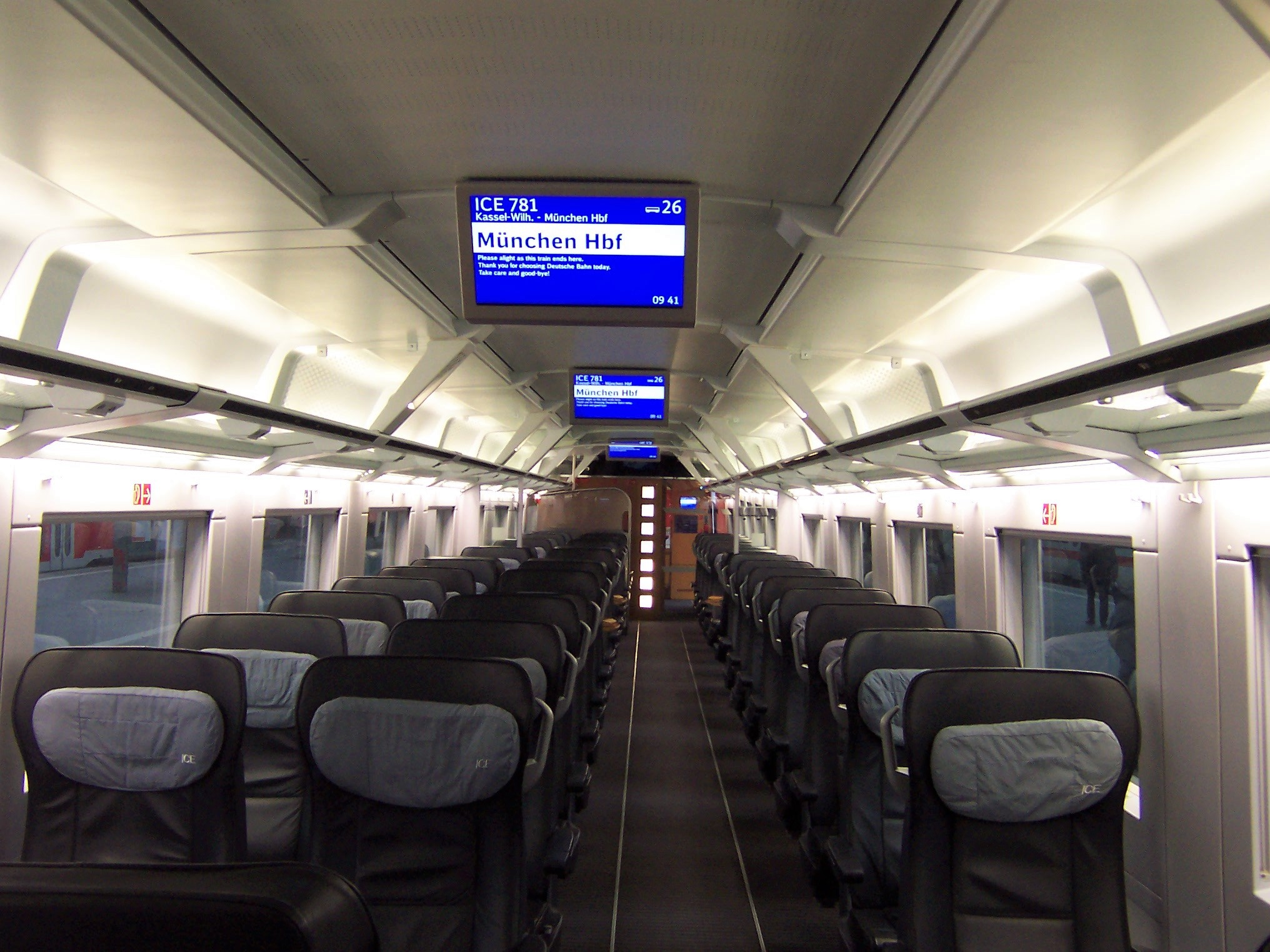
Refurbished 1st class interior

Starting from 2019 all ICE 1 trainsets will receive a second major overhaul to stay in service until at least 2030. The first of these refurbished sets was finished in April 2020, and is used in passenger service since June of the same year. Changes include:

- Each trainset being shortened from 12 to 9 cars, with one First Class Car and two Second Class Cars being removed. These cars will be used as donors for spare parts.
- The Service Car being refurbished as a Second Class Car.
- LED displays (viewable from outside of the cars) and passenger information system screens (viewable from the inside) are installed at the doors, displaying the ICE's line number, next stops and Terminus, similar to those installed in the ICE 2 cars.
- Additional storage room for the passengers' luggage.
- A renovation of the restrooms and the Family Areas.
- New seats in the cabs.

The refurbished units are planned to be used on the ICE Sprinter lines and on routes with medium high traffic. On those with high to extremely high traffic they are to be replaced by the ICE 4 trains.

=== Accidents ===
==== Eschede ====
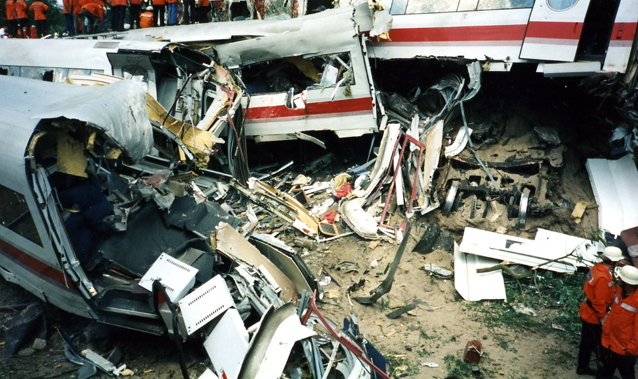
Scene of the accident

On 3 June 1998 ICE 1 set 151 derailed on the Hanover–Hamburg railway at Eschede, approximately 60 km (37 mi) north of Hanover. The train was on its way from Munich to Hamburg as ICE 884 "Wilhelm Conrad Röntgen", when the wheel of a first class car broke, and changed the setting of a railroad switch. Subsequently, the following cars derailed and crashed into the pillars of a bridge the train was just passing under, causing it to collapse on top of the train.

101 people were killed and 88 were seriously injured. It remains the worst rail disaster in the history of the Federal Republic of Germany and the worst high speed rail disaster worldwide.

Set 151 was almost completely destroyed; only the almost undamaged power car 401 051 as well as a few other intermediate cars have been reused in other sets. The trailing power car was used for the reconstruction of power car 401 573.

== Technology ==
Traction of the ICE 1 trainsets is achieved by the eight driven axles of both power cars. Because relatively few axles have traction, the steepness of the grade the trains can safely negotiate are limited. The ICE 1 is limited to grades of about 3.5%. Steeper grades cannot be negotiated safely, because the wheels could slip due to the low adhesion under adverse conditions, which may lead to a stopped train becoming stuck on a grade. This is one of the reasons the ICE 1 is not homologated for the Cologne-Frankfurt high-speed rail line, which has grades of up to 4%.

The intermediate cars sit on Minden-Deutz type MD 522 bogies with steel suspension and an axle base of 2,500 mm (8 ft 2 in). New wheels have a diameter of 920 mm (3 ft 0 in). They are replaced when they reach a diameter of 860 mm (2 ft 10 in). The cars are coupled 900 mm (2 ft 11 in) above the rails by a semi-automatic coupling that was designed specifically for the ICE 1. It couples two brake pipes, two electric trainlines, cables and two fibre-optic cables. The passage between two cars is 1.1 m (3 ft 7 in) wide and 2.05 m (6 ft 9 in) high. Unlike on the InterCityExperimental, they are not positive locked on the outside.

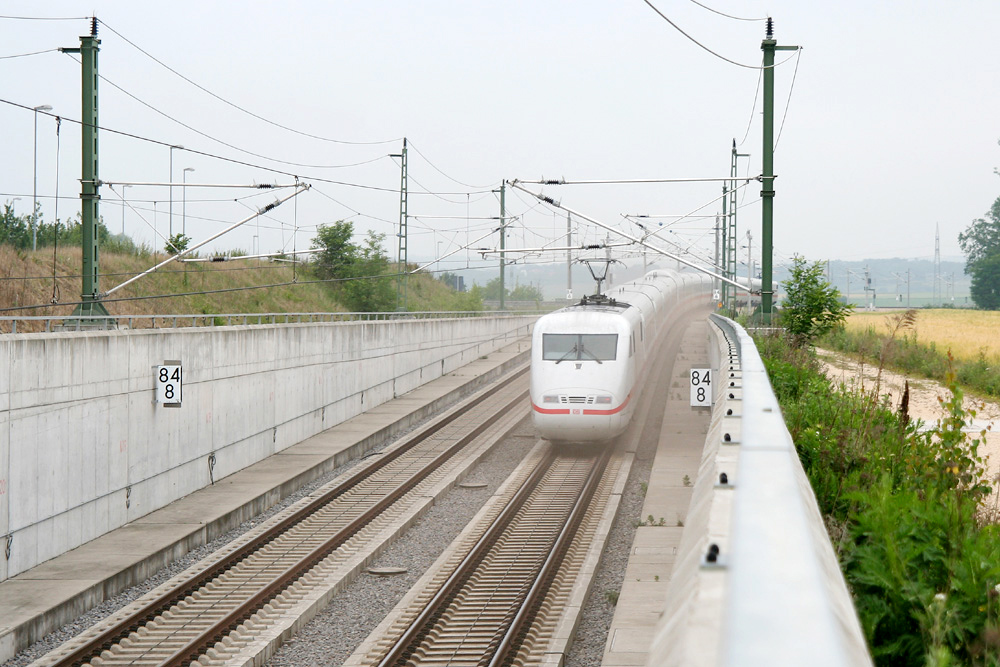
Emergency braking of an ICE 1 north of the Auditunnel. Note the dust to the right of the train.

The acceleration distance of a trainset with 14 cars to 100 km/h (62 mph) − starting at standstill, on level terrain − is given as 900 m (2,952 ft 9 in) (66 seconds), to 200 km/h (125 mph) on 250 km/h (155 mph) (200 s) and to 250 km/h (155 mph) on 18,350 m (11.40 mi) (380 s). Braking distance of a service stop under LZB control (0,5 m/s²) from 250 km/h (155 mph) is given as 4,820 m (3.00 mi) that of a fast braking (1,05 m/s²) at 2,300 m (1.4 mi). For braking all cars have disc brakes. Additionally, the power heads use regenerative brakes, the intermediate cars have electromagnetic track brakes. The power cars have spring-loaded parking brakes; intermediate cars use screw brakes for the same purpose. The bogies facilitate replacing the track brakes with eddy current brakes.

The pantograph type DSA-350 S was specifically developed by Dornier for use in the ICE 1. At 100 kg (220 lb) they were considered very lightweight with minimal resonance. Unlike its predecessor InterCityExperimental, the ICE 1 does not have a high-voltage connection of both power cars. Because of this, the pantographs of both power cars are raised during operation.

In the 1990s, the two phone booths inside each trainset were connected to Deutsche Telekom's C-Netz by 13 so-called Funkfeststationen. Inside the tunnels of the first two high-speed lines, repeaters were installed at a distance of 1500 meters that communicated with the trains using leaky feeders. Between the tunnels, directional antennas were used. Inside the trains, antennas were installed in the service cars. Calls cost 0.7 DM per time unit. The same time unit cost 0.23 DM when using a landline.

=== ETCS Cab Signalling ===
The 19 ICE 1 trainsets used for service into Switzerland were equipped with the European Train Control System (ETCS) in 2007 The cost of 34 million Swiss Francs was paid by the Swiss government. Spending tax money for refitting foreign trains has been a target for criticism.

Switzerland paid for the equipment after Deutsche Bahn had announced the it would not convert any of their high-speed lines to ETCS cab signalling within the following ten years. Because of this, DB claimed to have no interest in refitting ICE trainsets with ETCS. If ETCS is used on any high-speed line in Germany within ten years, Switzerland has to be paid back part of the cost.

ETCS is used in Switzerland on the newly built Mattstetten–Rothrist line that has been used by ICE 1 trains since 10 December 2006. Currently, the line is used by three to four pairs of ICE trains each day, including one intra-Swiss ICE from Bern to Basel.

== Design ==
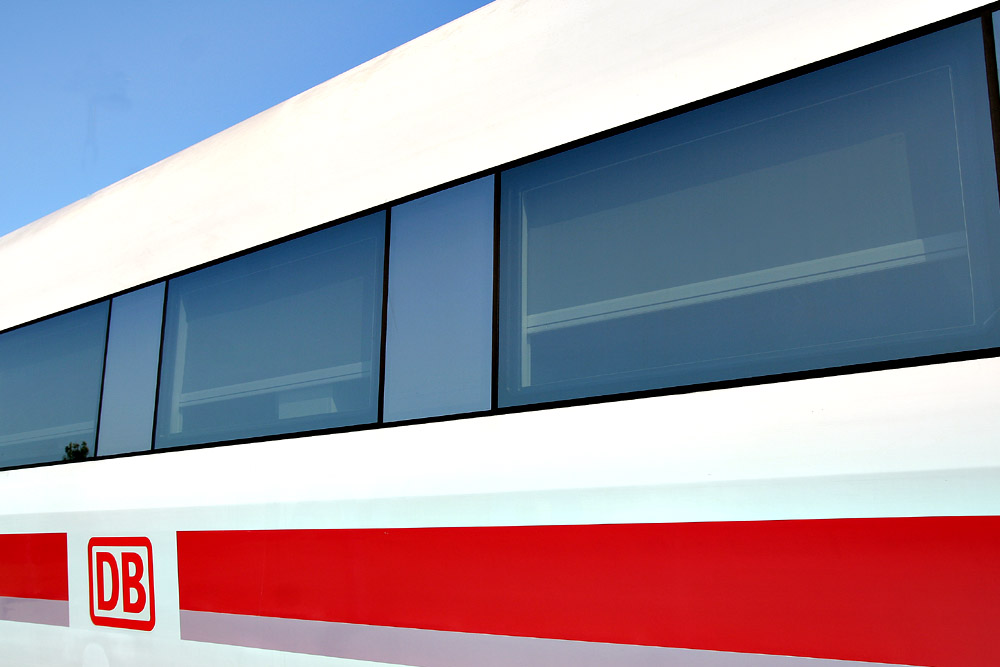
Throughout the 1990s ICE 1 trains had a dual-colored ornamental strip in oriental red and pastell violet. Note the small blind windows between the real ones.

The exterior design of the InterCityExperimental by Alexander Neumeister was applied to the series production with only minor adjustments. Neumeister's concept for the interior however was not used. The interior was designed by Jens Peters. The same team had designed the InterRegio trains in the mid-1980s.

Aerodynamic reasons led to the design of the power cars' front as well as the flush fitting of the windows and the low skirts. In places without windows, 6 mm (0.24 in) thick glass is used to continue the ribbon glazing.

The exterior design is very similar to that of the ICE 2. A major difference to all other ICE generations is the raised roof of the restaurant car. The ICE 1 is the only ICE without electronic displays for route information of the outside; the car numbers are indicated by adhesive labels. ICE 1 trainsets have car numbers ranging from 1 to 14, while all other ICE trains have car numbers from 21 to 44.

== Operation ==
An ICE 1 train leaves Ingolstadt Hauptbahnhof towards Munich.

An ICE 1 heading towards Nuremberg on the Nuremberg–Ingolstadt high-speed railway at 250 km/h.

Deutsche Bahn is the sole operator and owner of ICE 1 trains. There are currently 59 units of twelve intermediate cars. At about 750 seats and a length of 360 meters, the ICE 1 trainsets are the longest ICE trains that have been built yet. Other ICE trains have the same length and capacity when two (sometimes three) trainsets are coupled.

The trainsets are used in synchronized schedules on the Hanover-Würzburg high-speed rail line:

1. Hamburg-Altona via Hannover–Göttingen–Kassel-Wilhelmshöhe–Frankfurt (Main)–Mannheim–Karlsruhe–Baden-Baden–Freiburg to Basel (ICE line 20) or to Stuttgart (branching off at Mannheim, ICE line 22)
2. Berlin via Wolfsburg–Braunschweig–Hildesheim–Göttingen–Kassel-Wilhelmshöhe–Fulda–Hanau–Frankfurt (Main)–Mannheim to Karlsruhe–Offenburg–Basel (ICE line 12) or Stuttgart–Ulm–Augsburg–Munich (ICE line 11)
3. Hamburg-Altona via Hannover–Göttingen–Kassel-Wilhelmshöhe–Würzburg–Nuremberg–Ingolstadt to Munich (ICE line 25)
4. Hamburg-Altona to Berlin (part of ICE line 28)

Additionally, there are single trains of other ICE lines serviced by ICE 1 trainsets. Until December 2007, ICE trains from Germany to Innsbruck and Vienna were ICE 1 services as well.

Because they exceed the UIC loading gauge, ICE 1, ICE 2 and Metropolitan trainsets are collectively referred to as ICE A in internal use.

All 59 trainsets are based at Hamburg-Eidelstedt.

== Names ==
Since October 2002, certain ICE trainsets have carried the names of cities:

- Tz 01 – Gießen
- Tz 02 – Jever
- Tz 03 – Neu-Isenburg
- Tz 04 – Fulda
- Tz 05 – Offenbach am Main
- Tz 06 – Itzehoe
- Tz 07 – Plattling
- Tz 08 – Lichtenfels
- Tz 09 – Lüneburg
- Tz 10 – Gelsenkirchen
- Tz 11 – Nürnberg
- Tz 12 – Memmingen
- Tz 13 – Frankenthal/Pfalz
- Tz 14 – Friedrichshafen
- Tz 15 – Regensburg
- Tz 16 – Pforzheim
- Tz 17 – Hof
- Tz 19 – Osnabrück
- Tz 52 – Hanau
- Tz 53 – Neumünster
- Tz 54 – Flensburg
- Tz 55 – Rosenheim
- Tz 56 – Heppenheim/Bergstraße
- Tz 57 – Landshut
- Tz 58 – Gütersloh
- Tz 59 – Bad Oldesloe
- Tz 60 – Mülheim an der Ruhr
- Tz 61 – Bebra
- Tz 62 – Geisenheim/Rheingau
- Tz 66 – Gelnhausen
- Tz 67 – Garmisch-Partenkirchen
- Tz 68 – Crailsheim
- Tz 69 – Worms
- Tz 71 – Heusenstamm
- Tz 72 – Aschaffenburg
- Tz 73 – Basel
- Tz 74 – Zürich
- Tz 76 – Bremen
- Tz 77 – Rendsburg
- Tz 78 – Bremerhaven
- Tz 80 – Castrop-Rauxel
- Tz 81 – Interlaken
- Tz 82 – Rüdesheim am Rhein
- Tz 83 – Timmendorfer Strand
- Tz 84 – Bruchsal
- Tz 85 – Freilassing
- Tz 86 – Chur
- Tz 87 – Mühldorf a. Inn
- Tz 88 – Hildesheim
- Tz 90 – Ludwigshafen am Rhein

(Tz xx = trainset number (Triebzugnummer); printed above each bogie)

== See also ==
- List of high-speed trains
