= Rail transport in Italy =

Italy
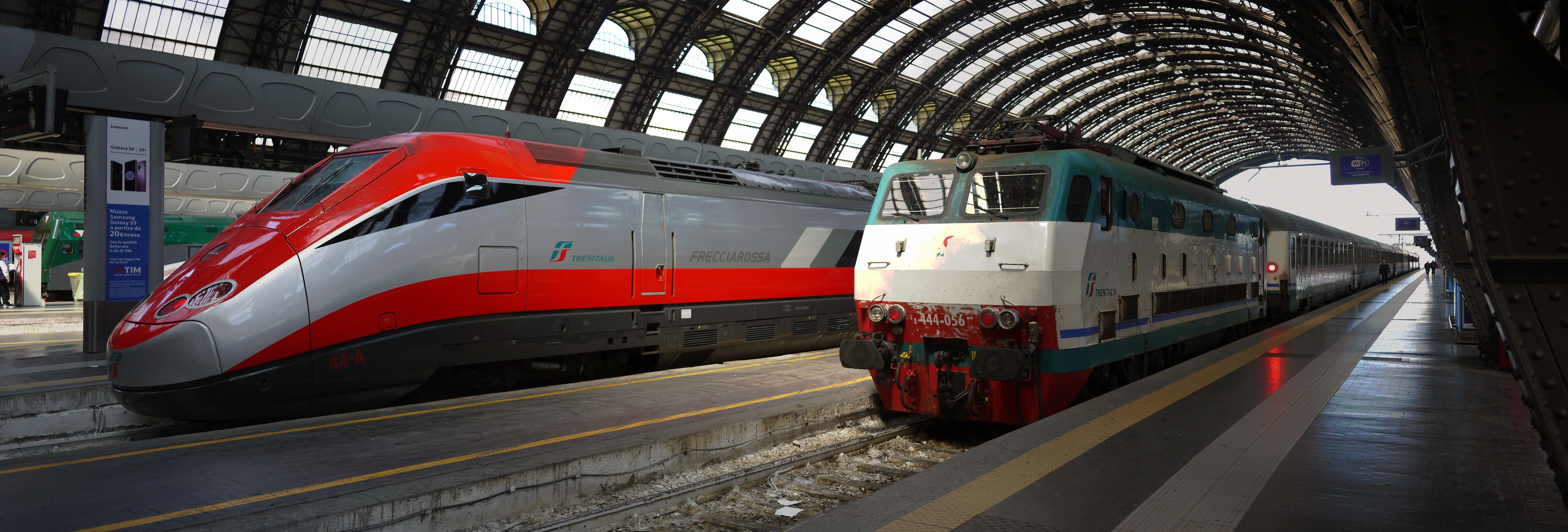
- A frecciarossa high-speed train next to an older E.444R at Milano Centrale

Operation
- National railway: Ferrovie dello Stato
- Major operators: Trenitalia (national).italo (national); Trenord (local); EAV (local); Trenitalia Tper (local); Ferrovie del Sud Est (local); Mercitalia (freight)

Statistics
- Ridership: 883.3 million (2019)

System length
- Total: 16,832 km (10,459 mi)
- Double track: 7,734 km (4,806 mi)

Track gauge
- Main: 1,435 mm (4 ft 8 1/2 in) standard gauge

Electrification
- 3 kV DC: conventional lines
- 25 kV AC: high-speed lines

The Italian railway system is one of the most important parts of the infrastructure of Italy, with a total length of 24,567 km (15,265 mi) of which active lines are 16,832 km (10,459 mi). The network has recently grown with the construction of the new high-speed rail network. Italy is a member of the International Union of Railways (UIC). The UIC Country Code for Italy is 83. In 2024, the Italian national rail service Trenitalia was recognized as the best rail passenger operator in Europe.

== The network ==
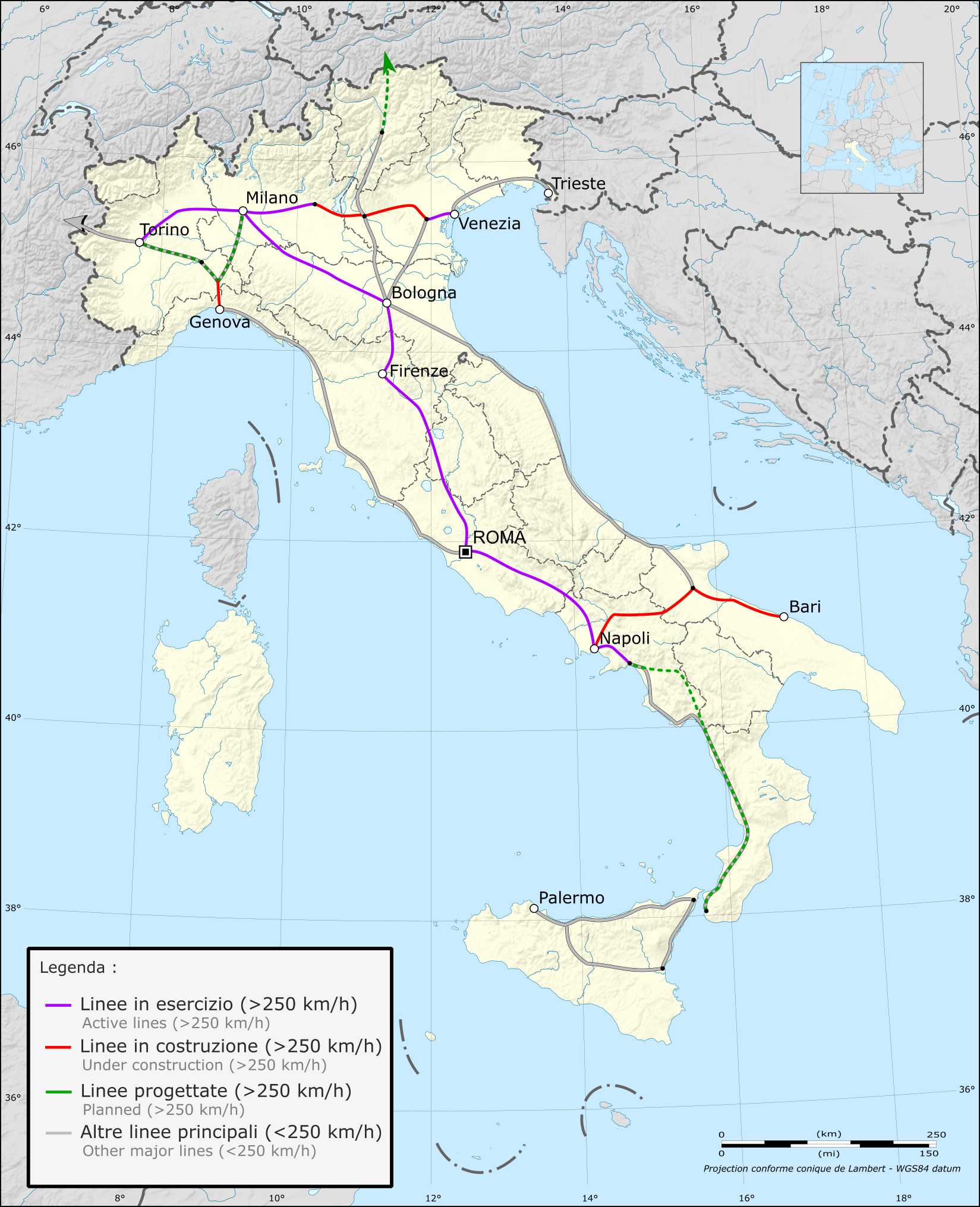
Map of Italian high-speed and higher speed rail network

RFI (Rete Ferroviaria Italiana, Italian Rail Network), a state owned infrastructure manager which administers most of the Italian rail infrastructure. The Italian railway system has a length of 19,394 km (12,051 mi), of which 18,071 km (11,229 mi) standard gauge. The active lines are 16,723 km (10,391 mi), of which 7,505 km (4,663 mi) are double tracks. Italy has 2,507 people and 12.46 km^{2} per kilometre of rail track, giving Italy the world's 13th-largest rail network.

Lines are divided into 3 categories:

- fundamental lines (fondamentali), which have high traffic and good infrastructure quality, comprise all the main lines between major cities throughout the country. Fundamental lines are 6,460 km (4,010 mi) long;
- complementary lines (complementari), which have less traffic and are responsible for connecting medium or small regional centres. Most of these lines are single track and some are not electrified;
- node lines (di nodo), which link complementary and fundamental lines near metropolitan areas for a total 950 km (590 mi).

Most of the Italian network is electrified (11,921 km (7,407 mi)). The electric system is 3 kV DC on conventional lines and 25 kV AC on high-speed lines.

A major part of the Italian rail network is managed and operated by RFI (Rete Ferroviaria Italiana, Italian Rail Network). Other regional agencies, mostly owned by public entities such as regional governments, operate on the Italian network.

Travellers who often make use of the railway during their stay in Italy might use rail passes, such as the European Interrail / Eurail passes or Italy's national and regional passes. These rail passes allow travellers the freedom to use regional trains during the validity period, but all high-speed and intercity trains require up to a 15-euro reservation fee. Regional passes, such as "Io viaggio ovunque Lombardia", offer one-day, multiple-day and monthly periods of validity. There are also saver passes for adults, who travel as a group, with savings up to 20%. Foreign travellers should purchase these passes in advance so that the passes can be delivered by post prior to the trip. When using the rail passes, the date of travel needs to be filled in before boarding the trains.

Map of the main branch of the Ferrovie Nord Milano lines

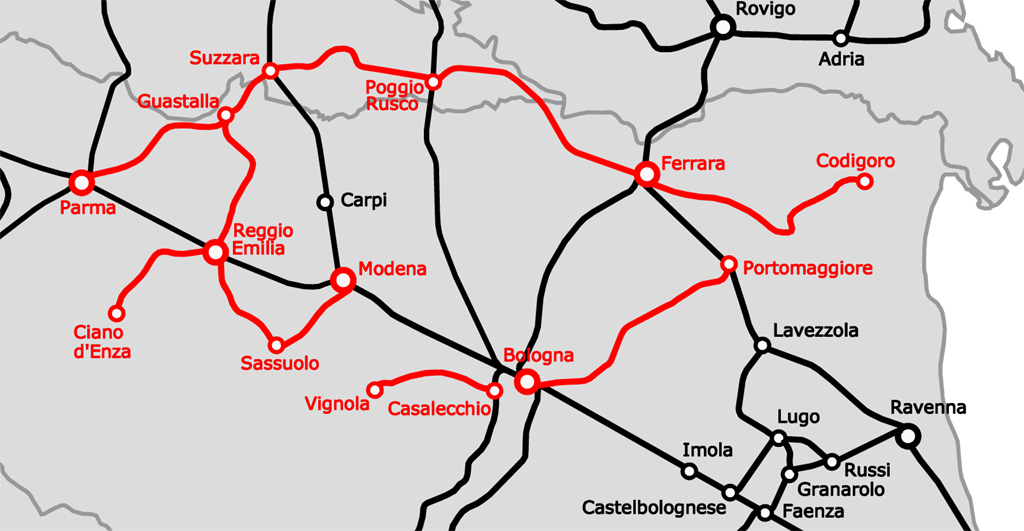
Marked in red, Ferrovie Emilia Romagna's railroad network

Companies certified to run railways in Italy are:

From 2000

- Ferrovie dello Stato S.p. A.
- Trenitalia S.p. A.

From 2001

- Metronapoli S.p. A.
- Ferrovie Nord Milano Esercizio S.p. A.
- Rail Traction Company S.p. A.

From 2002

- Del Fungo Giera Servizi Ferroviari S.p. A.
- Gruppo Torinese Trasporti S.p. A.(ex SATTI)
- SERFER Servizi Ferroviari S.r.l.
- Hupac S.p. A.

From 2003

- Ferrovie Emilia Romagna S.r.l.
- La Ferroviaria Italiana S.p. A.
- Cargo Nord S.r.l.
- Ferrovie Adriatico Sangritana S.r.l.
- Sistemi Territoriali S.p. A.
- Strade Ferrate del Mediterraneo S.r.l.
- Swiss Rail Cargo Italy S.r.l.

From 2004

- SBB Cargo Italia S.r.l.
- Ferrovie Nord Cargo S.r.l.
- Azienda Consorziale Trasporti di Reggio Emilia
- Ferrovia Alifana e Benevento Napoli S.r.l.
- Ferrovie Nord Milano Trasporti S.r.l.

From 2005

- Trasporto Ferroviario Toscano S.p. A. (La Ferroviaria Italiana S.p. A.)
- Ferrovie Centrali Umbre S.r.l.
- Railion Italia S.r.l. (ex S.F.M.)
- Rail One S.p. A.
- Azienda Trasporti Collettivi e Mobilità S.p. A.
- A.T.C. Bologna S.p. A.
- Monferail S.r.l.

From 2006

- SAD - Trasporto Locale S.p.A.
- Nord Cargo S.r.l. (ex Ferrovie Nord Cargo S.r.l.)
- Arenaways S.p.A.

== History ==
Rail network in Italy 1861-1870

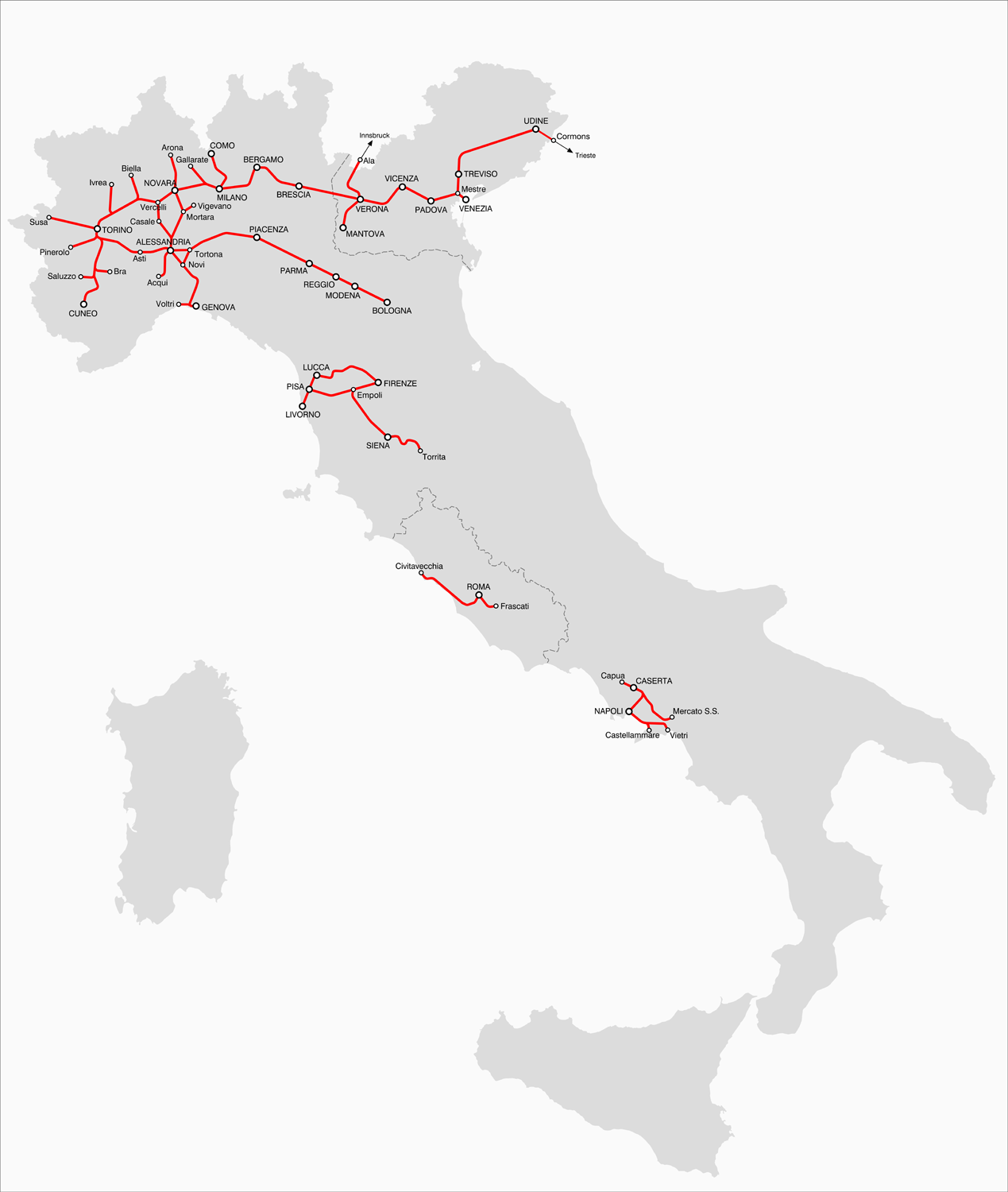
Network as of 17 March 1861

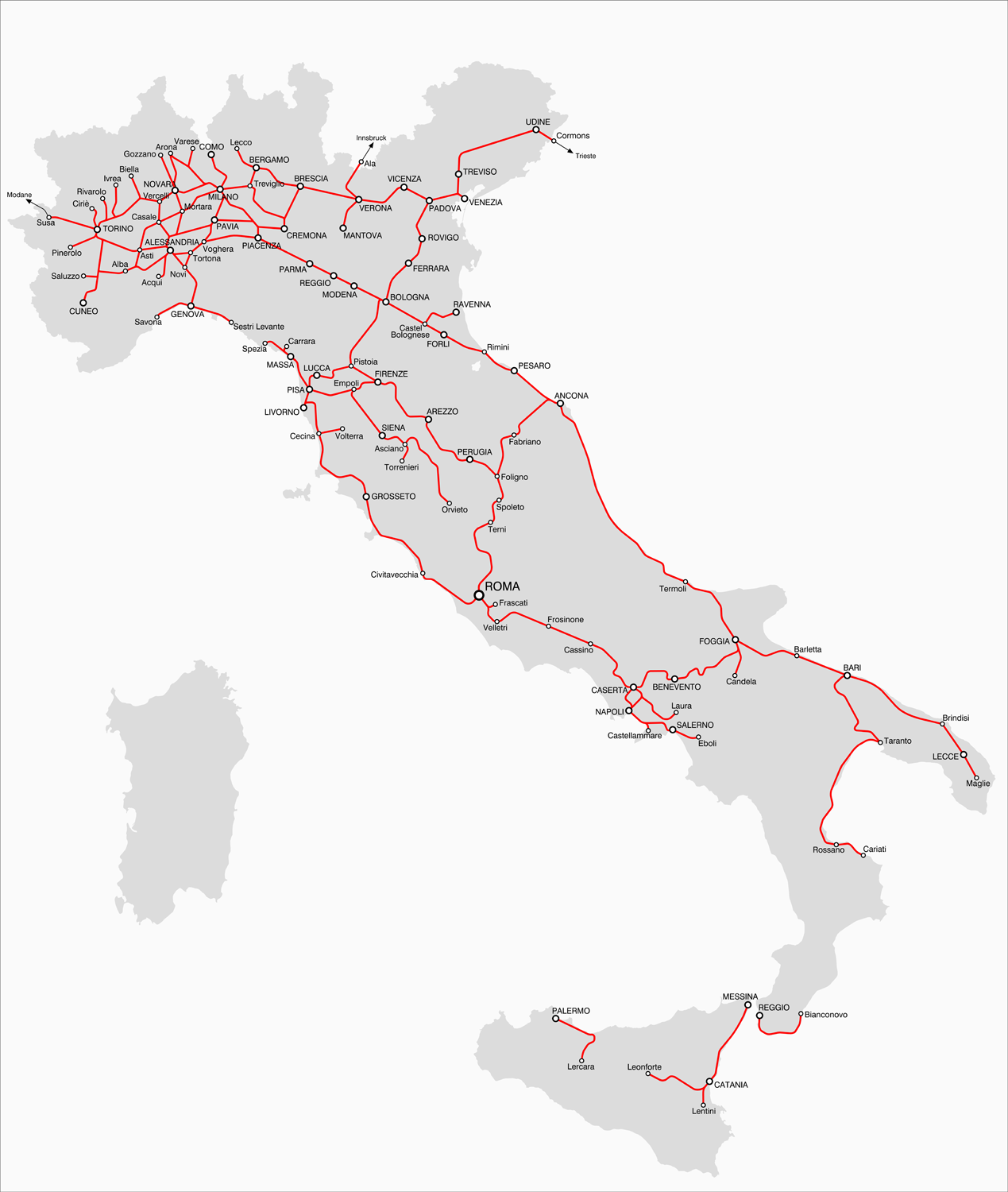
Network as of 20 September 1870

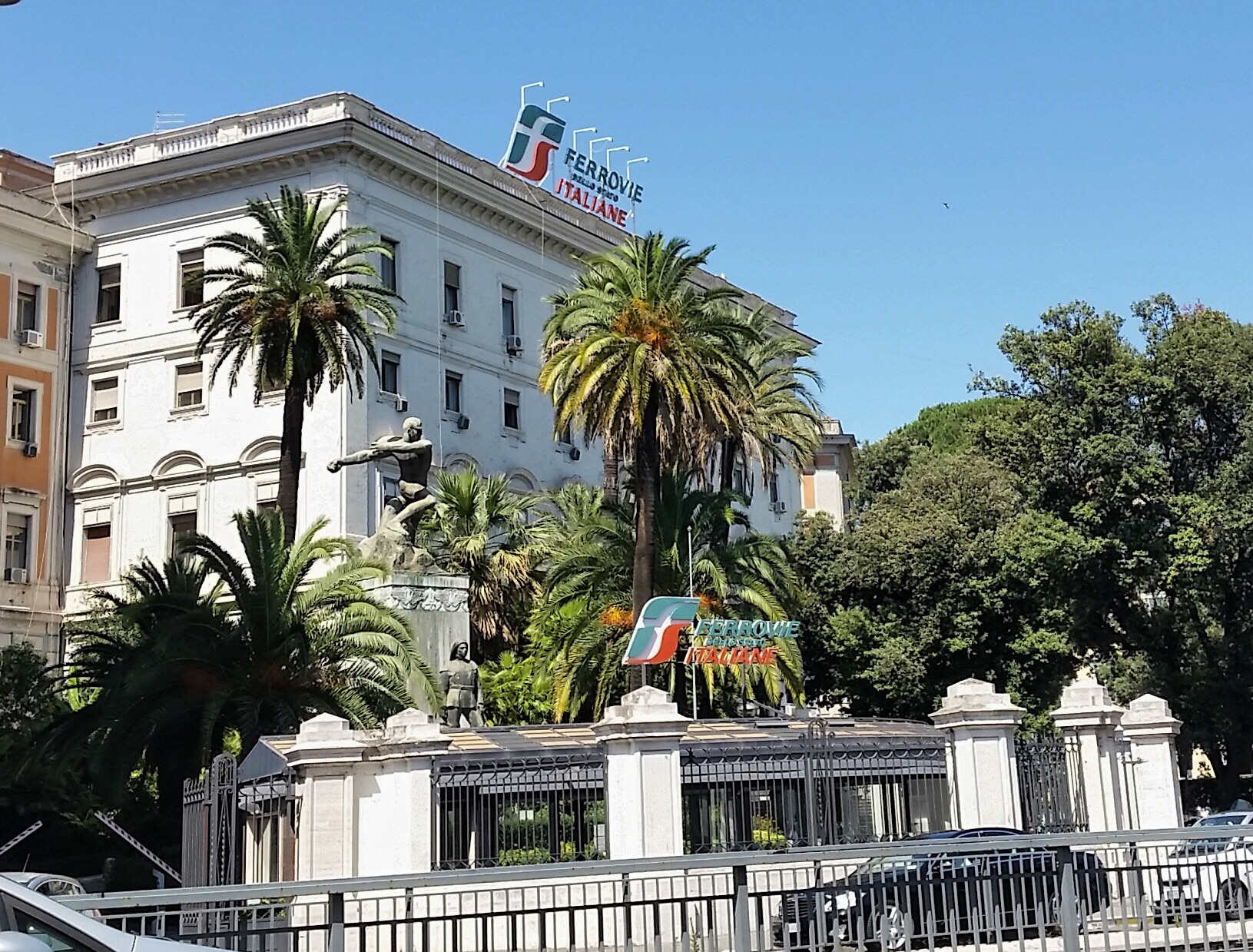
Head office of the Ferrovie dello Stato in Rome

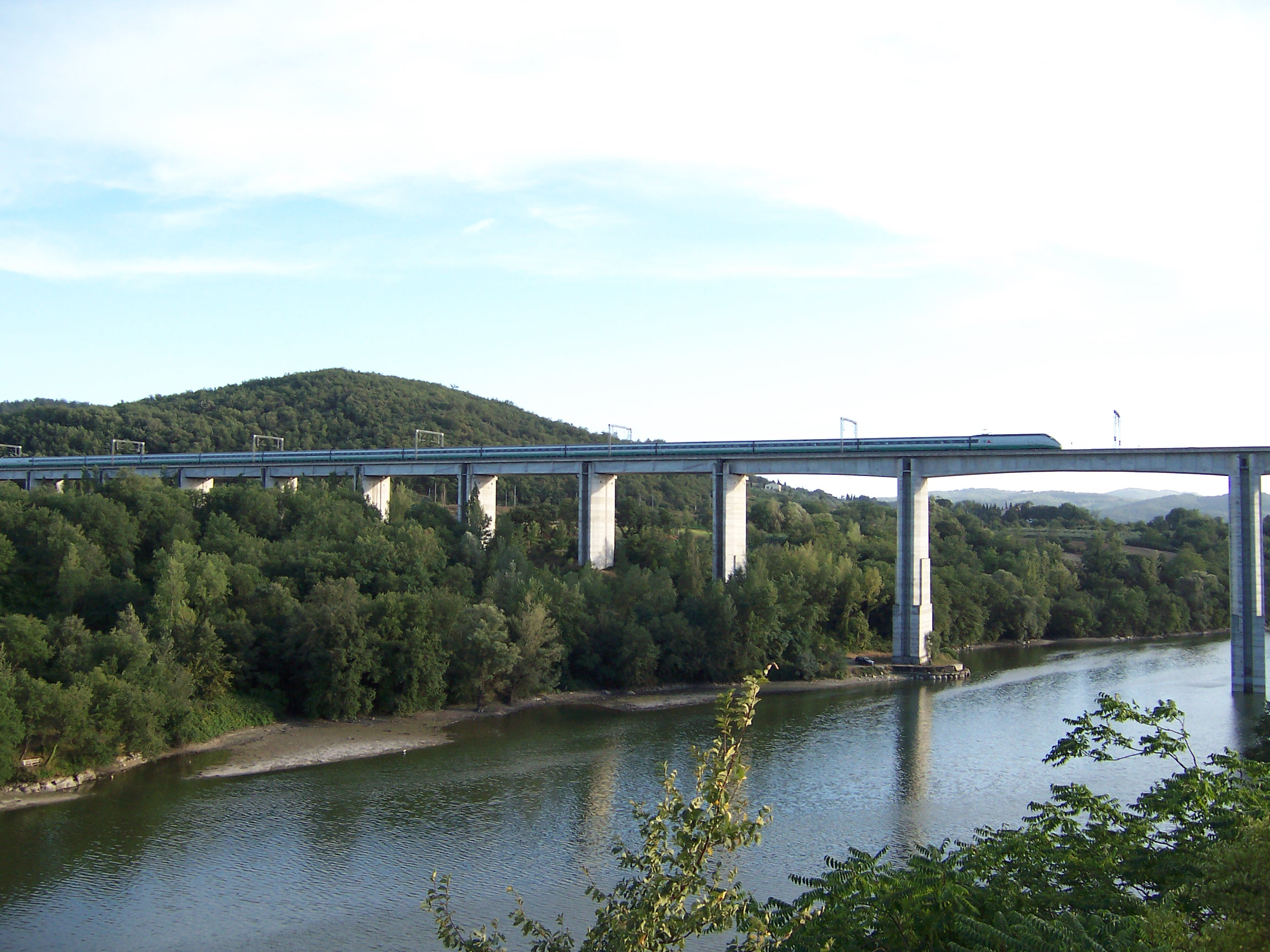
An ETR 500 train running on the Florence–Rome high-speed line near Arezzo, the first high-speed railway opened in Europe

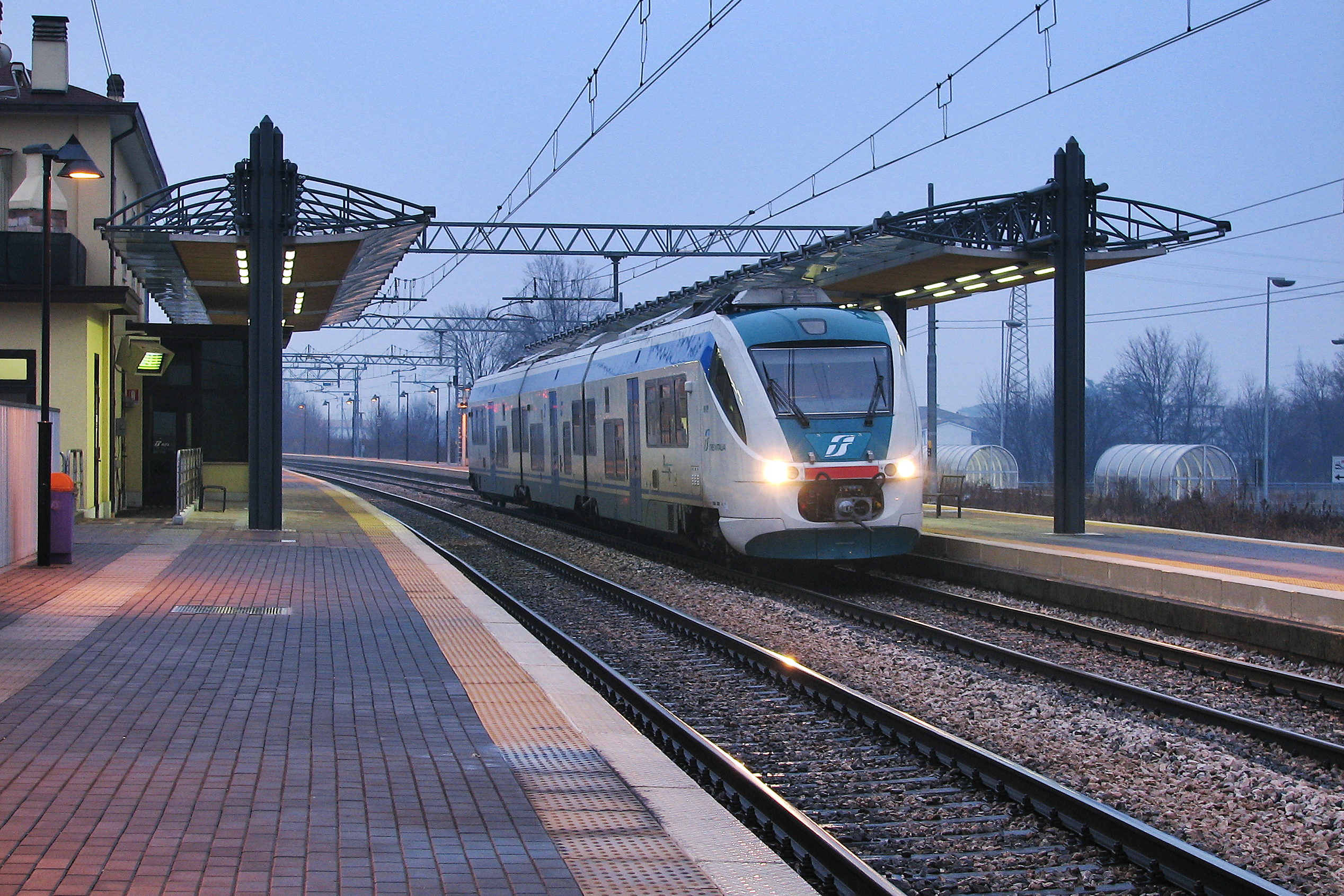
An Italian local train Minuetto

The first line to be built on the peninsula was the Naples–Portici line, in the Kingdom of the Two Sicilies, which was 7.64 km (4.75 mi) long and was inaugurated on 3 October 1839, nine years after the world's first "modern" inter-city railway, the Liverpool and Manchester Railway. The following year the firm Holzhammer of Bolzano was granted the "Imperial-Royal privilege" to build the Milano–Monza line (12 km (7.5 mi)), the second railway built in Italy, in the then Kingdom of Lombardy–Venetia, a part of the Austrian Empire.

After the creation of the Kingdom of Italy in 1861, a project was started to build a network from the Alps to Sicily, in order to connect the country. After unification, construction of new lines was boosted: in 1875, with the completion of the section Orte-Orvieto, the direct Florence–Rome line was completed, reducing the travel time of the former route passing through Foligno-Terontola. Private companies were definitively bought back by the Italian state on 1 July 1905, with the creation of the Ferrovie dello Stato (State Railways), or FFSS, with a total of 10,557 km (6,560 mi) of lines, of which it already owned 9,686 km (6,019 mi). The move was completed the following year with the acquisition of the remaining SFM network: by then FFSS possessed 13,075 km (8,124 mi) of lines, of which 1,917 km (1,191 mi) with double tracks.

The period from 1922 to 1939 was heavy with important construction and modernisation programmes for the Italian railways, which also incorporated 400 km (250 mi) from the Ferrovie Reali Sarde of Sardinia. The most important programme was that of the Rome–Naples and Bologna–Florence direttissimas ("very direct lines"): the first reduced the travel time from the two cities by an hour and a half; the second, announced proudly as "constructing Fascism", included the second longest tunnel in the world at the time, under the Apennines. Electrification on 3,000 V direct current was introduced, which later supplanted the existing three-phase system. Other improvements included automatic blocks, light signals, construction of numerous main stations (Milan Central, Napoli Mergellina, Roma Ostiense and others) and other technical modernisations. The first high-speed train was the Italian ETR 200, which in July 1939 went from Milan to Florence at 165 km/h (105 mph), with a top speed of 203 km/h (126 mph). With this service, the railway was able to compete with the upcoming aeroplanes. The Second World War stopped these services.

After World War II, Italy started to repair the damaged railways and built nearly 20,000 km (12,000 mi) of new tracks. Entire lines were out of action and much of the rolling stock was destroyed. Thanks to the Marshall Plan, in the following years they could be rebuilt, although the possibility of reorganizing the network was missed due to short-sighted policies. The main Battipaglia-Reggio Calabria line (running along the west coast) was doubled, while a program of updating of infrastructures, superstructures, services, colour-light signalling and cars was updated or extended. The three-phase lines were gradually turned into standard 3,000 V dc lines.

Increasing numbers of steam locomotives were replaced by electric or diesel ones; in the 1960s also the first unified passenger cars appeared and the first attempts of interoperability with foreign companies were started, culminating in the creation of Trans Europe Express services. Nowadays the rail tracks and infrastructure are managed by Rete Ferroviaria Italiana (RFI), while the train and the passenger section is managed mostly by Trenitalia. Both are Ferrovie dello Stato (FS) subsidiaries, once the only train operator in Italy.

== High-speed rail ==
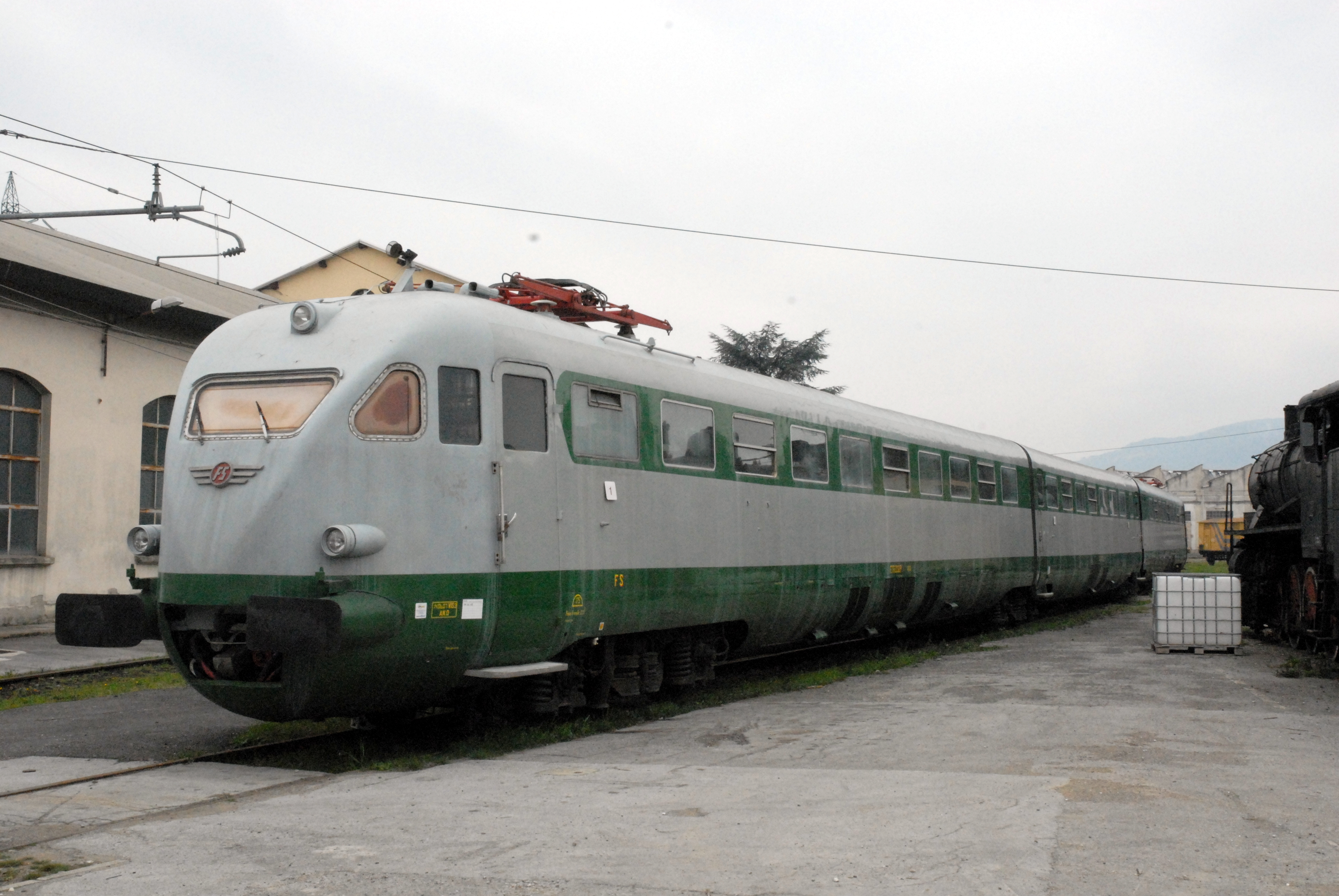
The original Italian ETR 200 trainset of the speed world record (203 km/h or 126 mph) in 1938, now preserved as historical train, was re-numbered ETR 232 in the 1960s

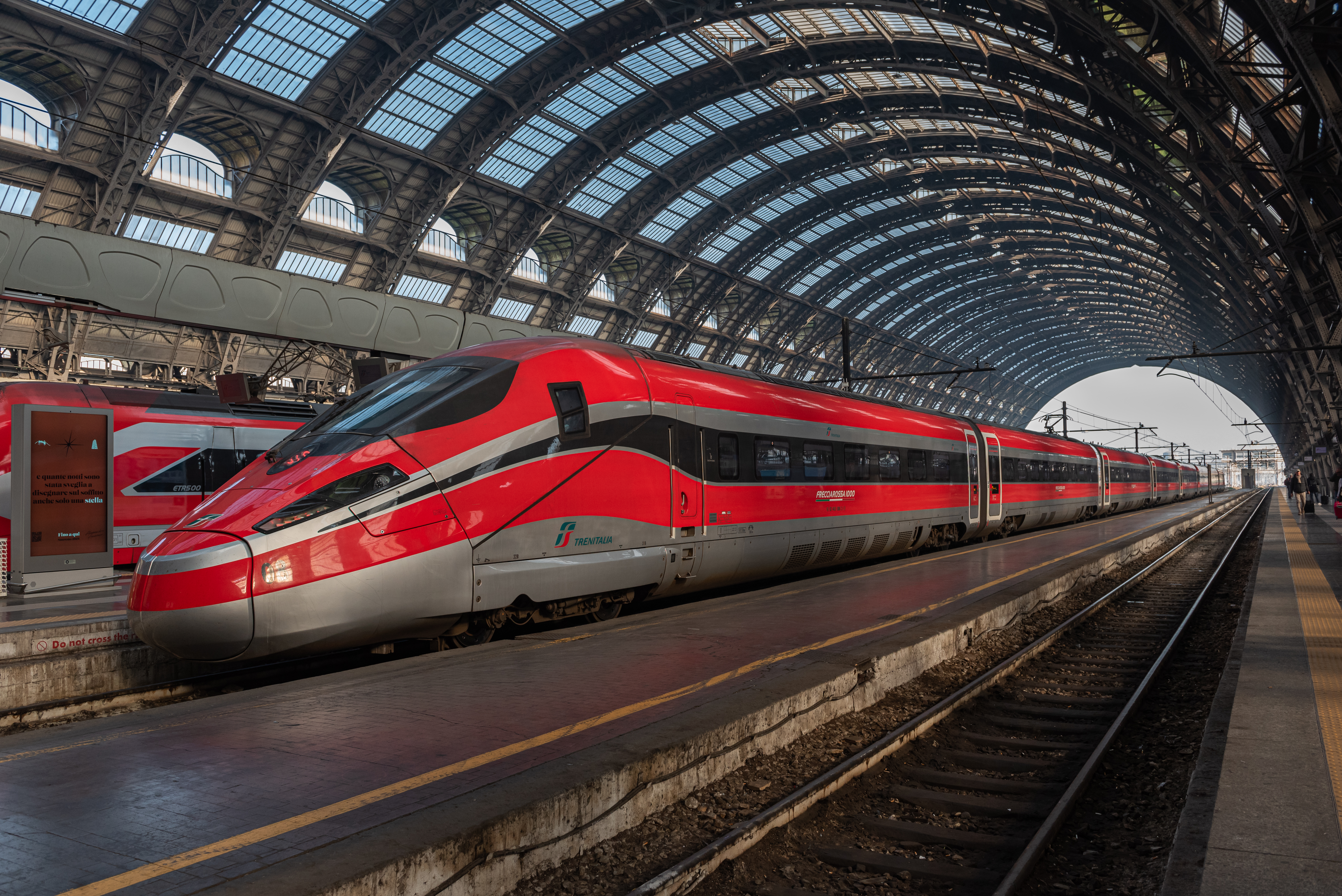
FS' Frecciarossa 1000 high speed train at Milano Centrale railway station, with a maximum speed of 400 km/h (249 mph), is one of the fastest trains in Europe.

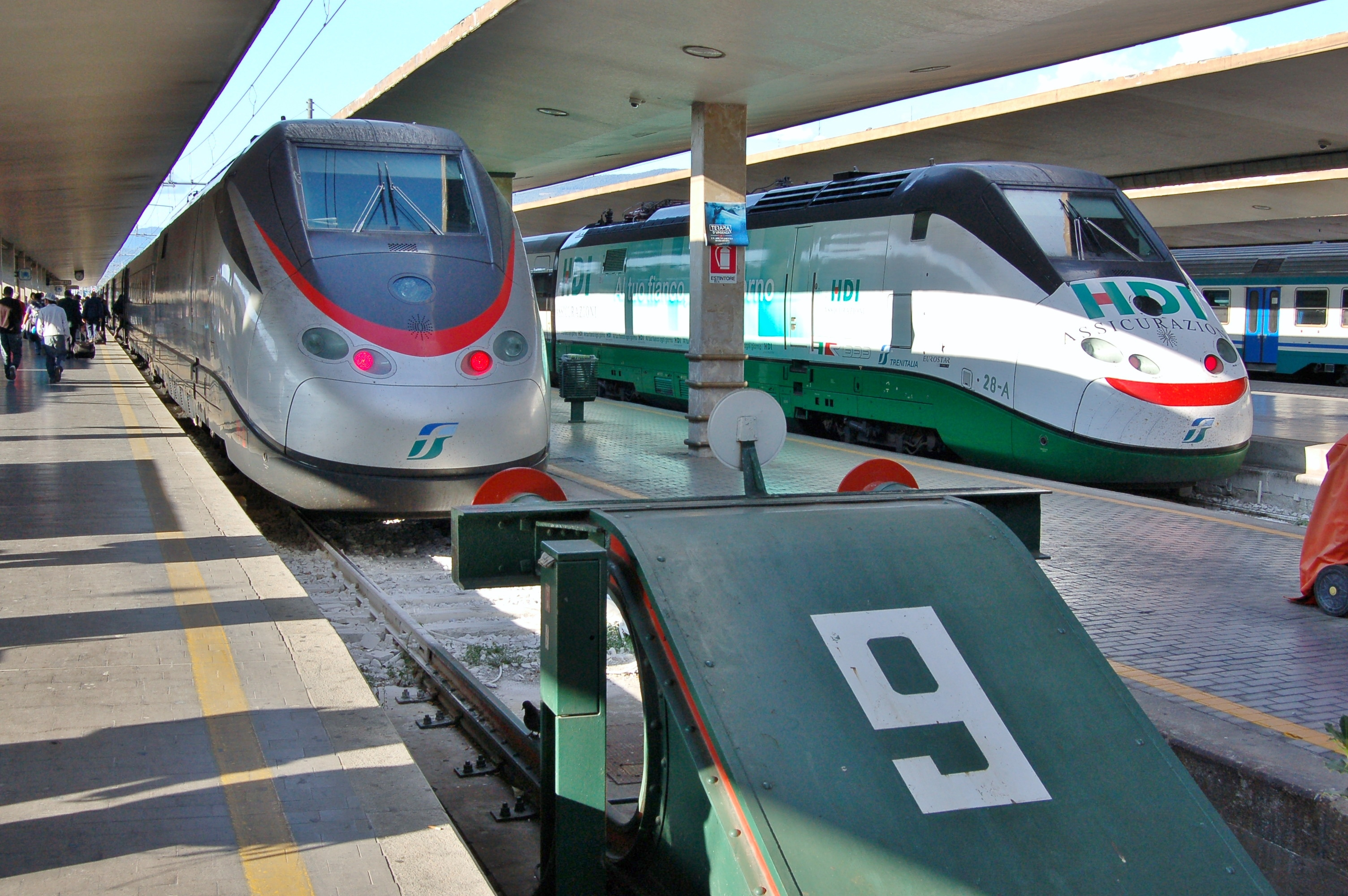
A pair of FS' ETR 500 at Firenze Santa Maria Novella railway station. The version ETR 500 Y1 achieved 362 km/h (225 mph) on the Bologna-Florence line on 4 February 2009, a new world speed record in a tunnel.

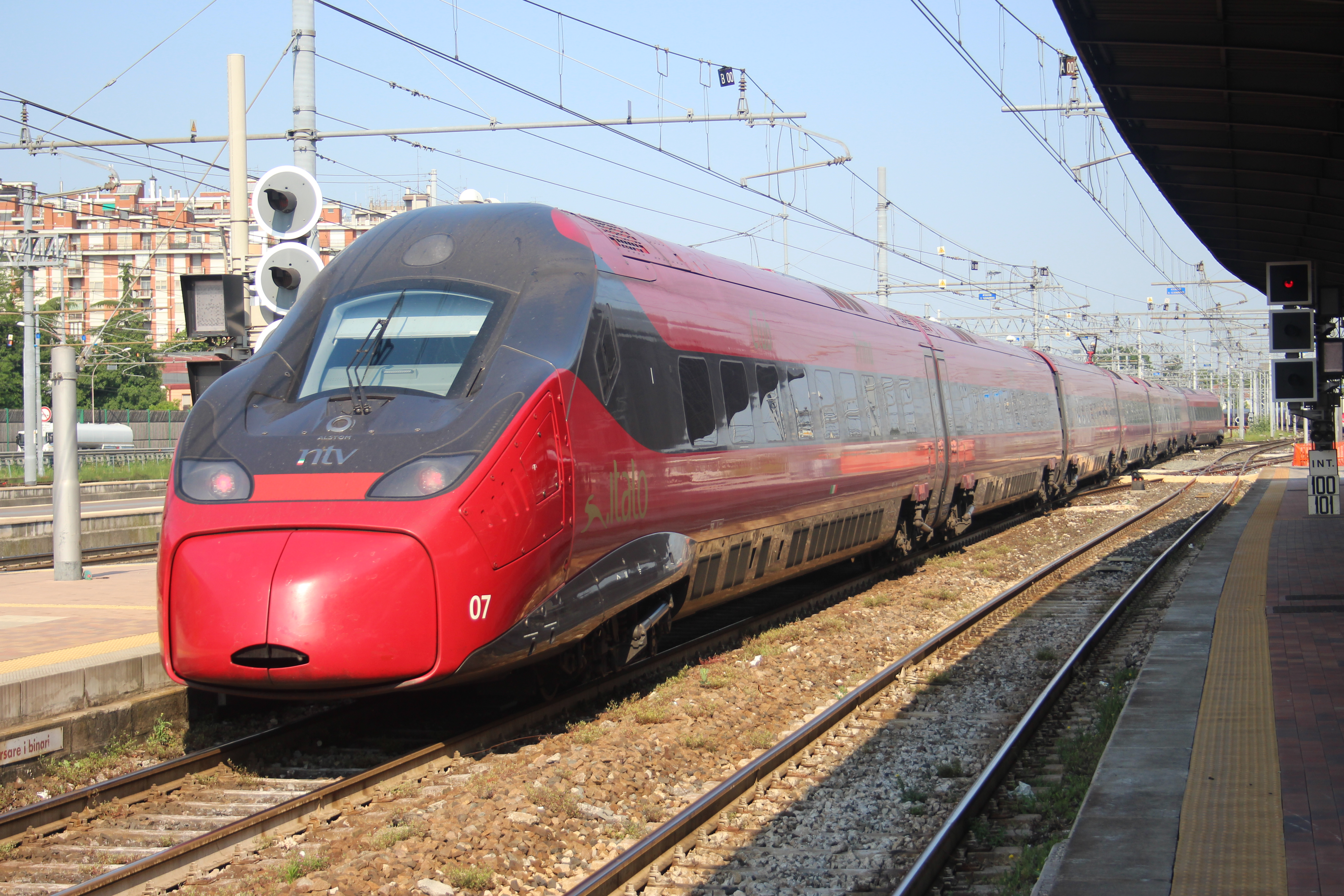
ETR 675 Italo EVO (NTV) at Venezia Mestre railway station.

The Italian high-speed service began in 1938 with an electric-multiple-unit ETR 200, designed for 200 km/h (120 mph), between Bologna and Naples. It too reached 160 km/h (99 mph) in commercial service, and achieved a world mean speed record of 203 km/h (126 mph) between Florence and Milan in 1938.

High-speed trains were developed during the 1960s. E444 locomotives were the first standard locomotives capable of top speed of 200 km/h (125 mph), while an ALe 601 electrical multiple unit (EMU) reached a speed of 240 km/h (150 mph) during a test. Other EMUs, such as the ETR 220, ETR 250 and ETR 300, were also updated for speeds up to 200 km/h (125 mph). The braking systems of cars were updated to match the increased travelling speeds.

On 25 June 1970, work was started on the Rome–Florence Direttissima, the first high-speed line in Italy and in Europe. It included the 5,375-metre-long (3.340 mi) bridge on the Paglia river, then the longest in Europe. Works were completed in the early 1990s.

In 1975, a program for a widespread updating of the rolling stock was launched. However, as it was decided to put more emphasis on local traffic, this caused a shifting of resources from the ongoing high-speed projects, with their subsequent slowing or, in some cases, total abandonment. Therefore, 160 E.656 electric and 35 D.345 locomotives for short-medium range traffic were acquired, together with 80 EMUs of the ALe 801/940 class, 120 ALn 668 diesel railcars. Some 1,000 much-needed passenger and 7,000 freight cars were also ordered.

In the 1990s, work started on the Treno Alta Velocità (TAV) project, which involved building a new high-speed network on the routes Milan – (Bologna–Florence–Rome–Naples) – Salerno, Turin – (Milan–Verona–Venice) – Trieste and Milan–Genoa. Most of the planned lines have already been opened, while international links with France, Switzerland, Austria and Slovenia are underway.

Most of the Rome–Naples line opened in December 2005, the Turin–Milan line partially opened in February 2006 and the Milan–Bologna line opened in December 2008. The remaining sections of the Rome–Naples and the Turin–Milan lines and the Bologna–Florence line were completed in December 2009. All these lines are designed for speeds up to 300 km/h (190 mph). Since then, it is possible to travel from Turin to Salerno (ca. 950 km (590 mi)) in less than 5 hours. More than 100 trains per day are operated.

Other proposed high-speed lines are Salerno-Reggio Calabria (connected to Sicily with the future bridge over the Strait of Messina), Palermo-Catania and Naples–Bari.

The main public operator of high-speed trains (alta velocità AV, formerly Eurostar Italia) is Trenitalia, part of FSI. Trains are divided into three categories (called "Le Frecce"): Frecciarossa ("Red arrow") trains operate at a maximum of 300 km/h (185 mph) on dedicated high-speed tracks; Frecciargento (Silver arrow) trains operate at a maximum of 250 km/h (155 mph) on both high-speed and mainline tracks; Frecciabianca (White arrow) trains operate at a maximum of 200 km/h (125 mph) on mainline tracks only.

Since 2012, a new and Italy's first private train operator, NTV (branded as Italo), run high-speed services in competition with Trenitalia. Even nowadays, Italy is the only country in Europe with a private high-speed train operator.

Construction of the Milan-Venice high-speed line began in 2013 and in December 2016 the Milan-Treviglio-Brescia section has been opened to passenger traffic; the Milan-Genoa high-speed line (Terzo Valico dei Giovi) is also under construction.

Today it is possible to travel from Rome to Milan in less than 3 hours (2h 55' without intermediate stops) with the Frecciarossa 1000, the new high-speed train. As of June 2024, there are 46 Trenitalia and 33 Italo round-trip high-speed trains every weekday that cover this route,

== Night trains ==
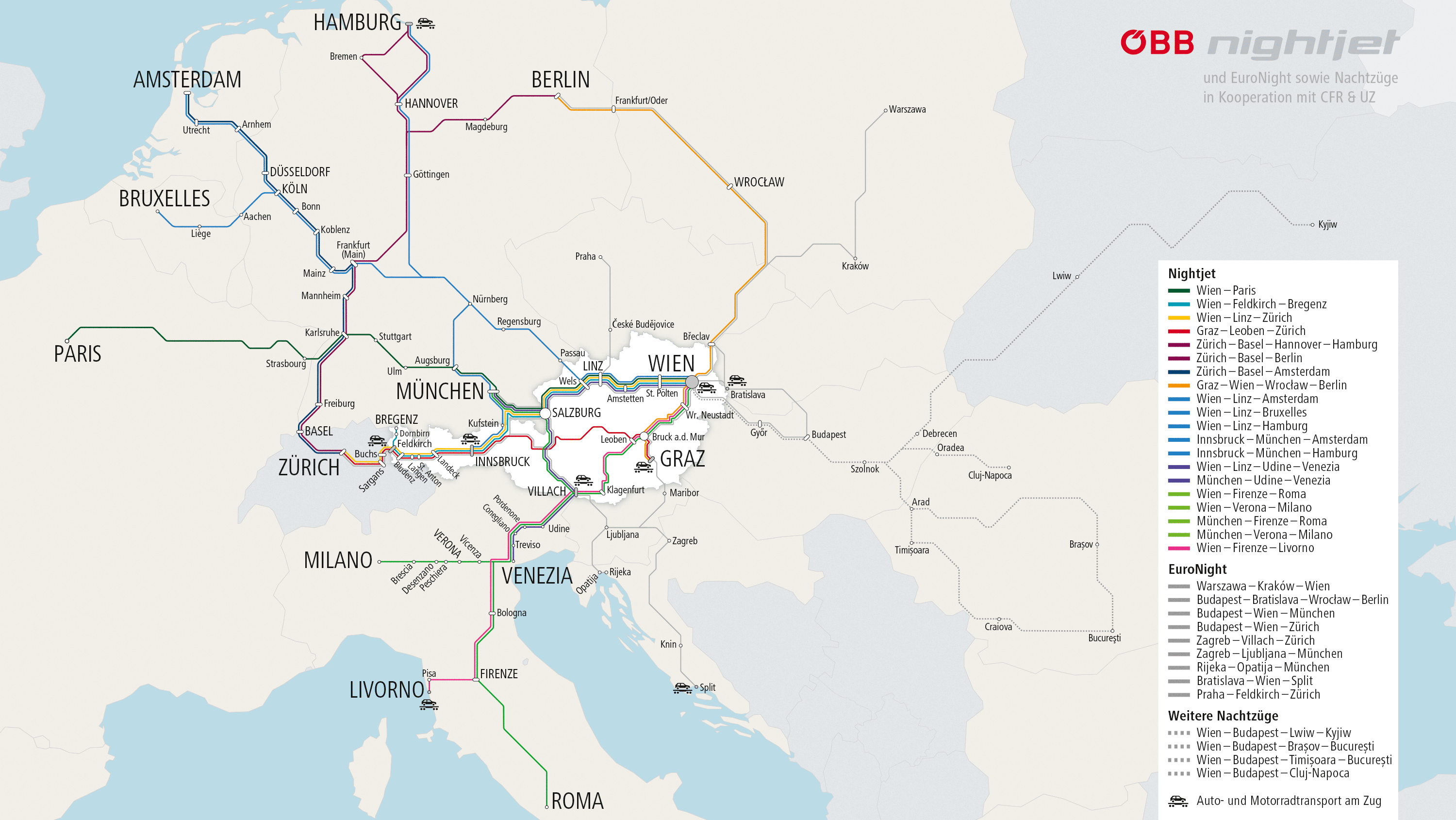
Nightjet Route Map (2023)

The Nightjet of the Austrian Federal Railways (ÖBB) serves different major cities in Italy like Rome, Venice, Florence and Milano. The trains can be used for rides inside Italy as well as for journeys abroad.

Nightjet trains offer beds in sleeper carriages (Nightjet's most comfortable service category), couchette carriages, and seated carriages. On certain connections, cars can also be transported on the train. Bikes can be transported in a bike transport bag, or on some connections also in special bike racks.

Trenitalia operates many night trains within Italy, under the brand Intercity Notte. Routes include connections between the Northern Italian cities of Turin, Milan, and Trieste, to Rome and further to Southern Italian cities such as Lecce or Palermo and Syracuse in Sicily. The trains offer standard seats as well as modern couchettes and sleeping compartments.

== Intercity trains ==
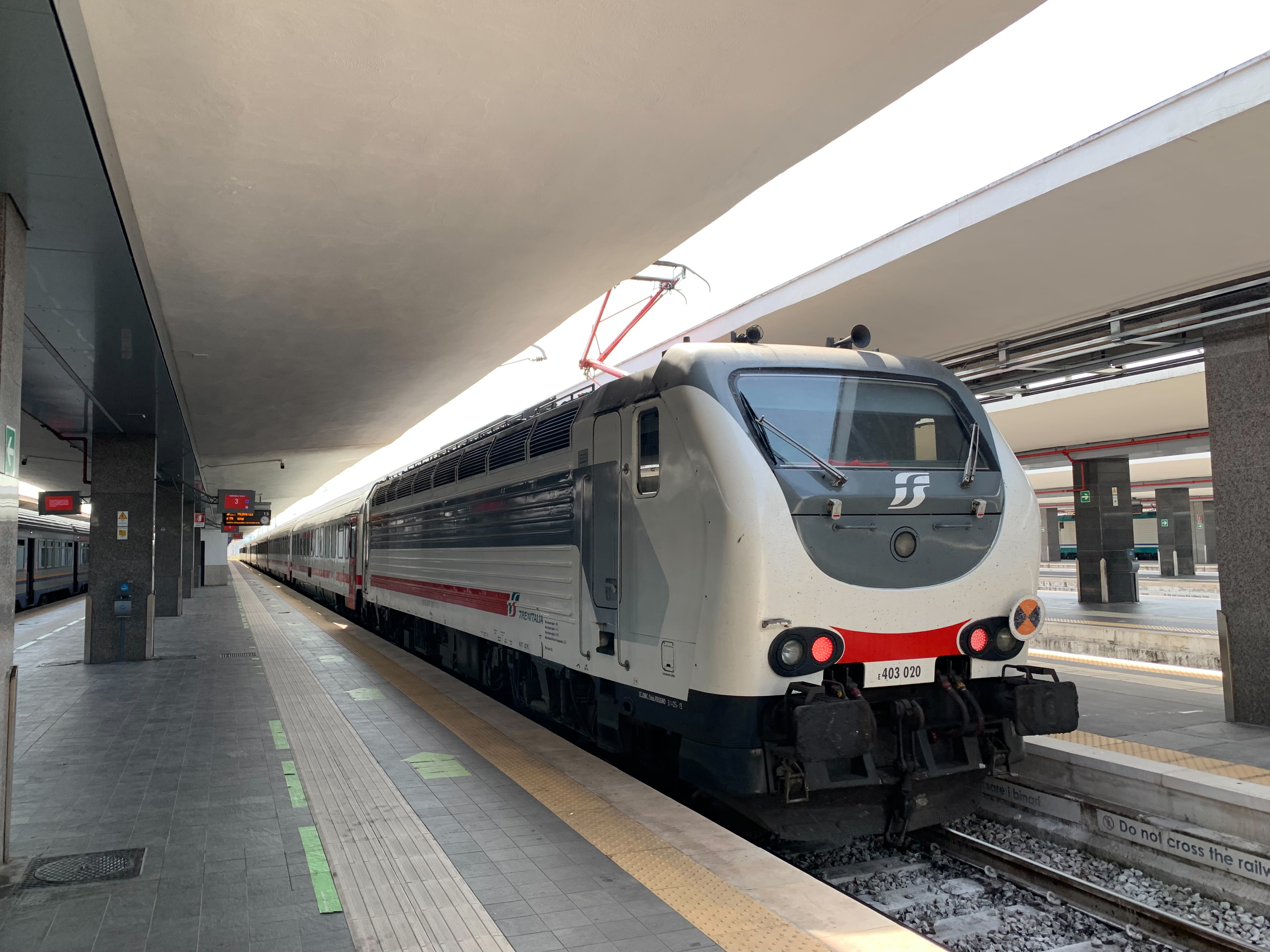
An Italian InterCity train at Napoli Centrale railway station

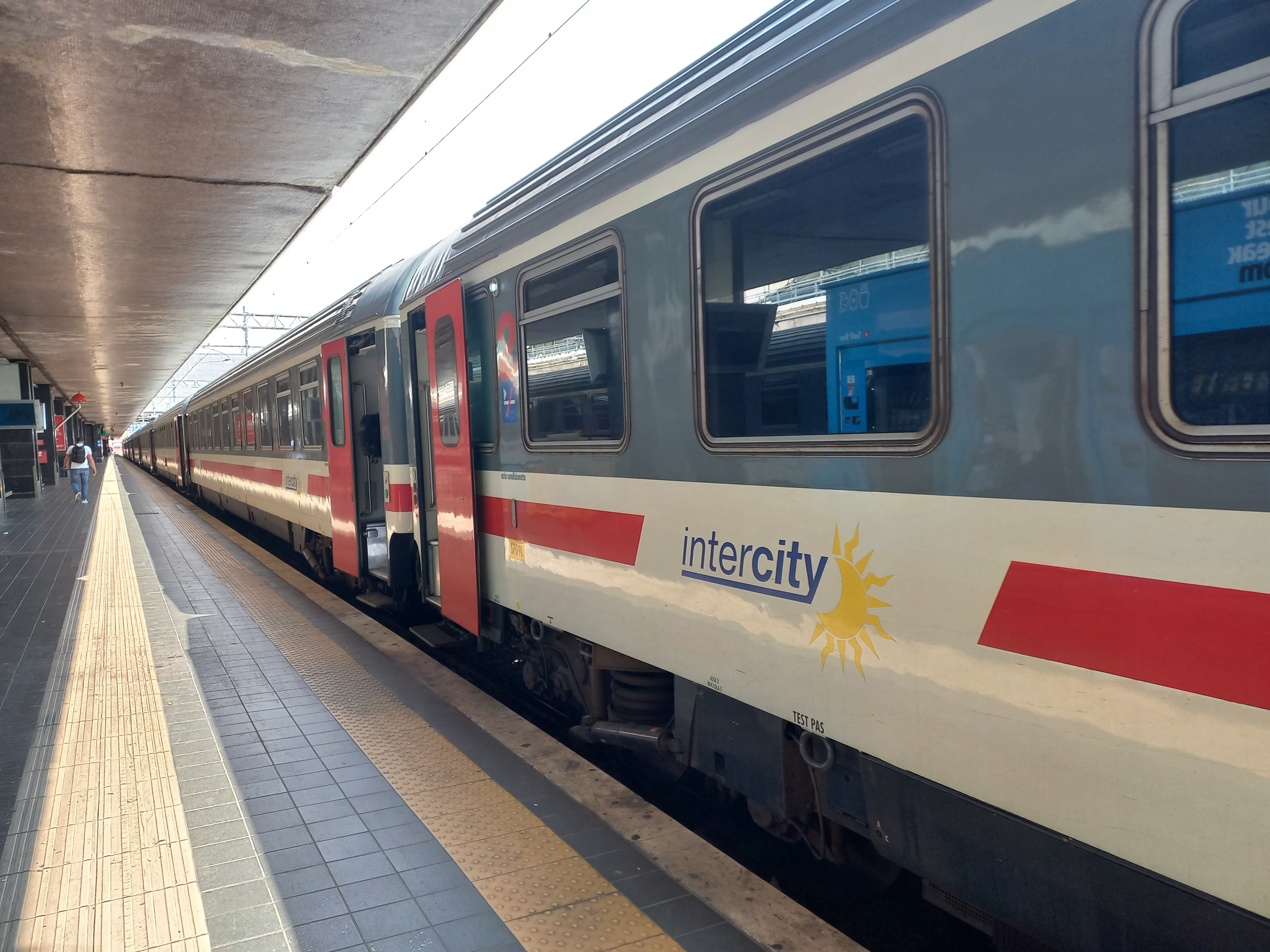
An Italian InterCity train at Roma Termini railway station

With the introduction of high-speed trains, intercity trains are limited to a few services per day on mainline and regional tracks.

The daytime services (InterCity IC), while not frequent and limited to one or two trains per route, are essential in providing access to cities and towns off the railway's mainline network. The main routes are Trieste to Rome (stopping at Venice, Bologna, Prato, Florence and Arezzo), Milan to Rome (stopping at Genoa, La Spezia, Pisa and Livorno / stopping at Parma, Modena, Bologna, Prato, Florence and Arezzo), Bologna to Lecce (stopping at Rimini, Ancona, Pescara, Bari and Brindisi) and Rome to Reggio di Calabria (stopping at Latina and Naples). In addition, the Intercity trains provide a more economical means of long-distance rail travel within Italy.

The night trains (Intercity Notte ICN) have sleeper compartments and washrooms, but no showers on board. The main routes are Rome to Bolzano/Bozen (calling at Florence, Bologna, Verona, Rovereto and Trento), Milan to Lecce (calling at Piacenza, Parma, Reggio Emilia, Modena, Bologna, Faenza, Forlì, Cesena, Rimini, Ancona, Pescara, Bari and Brindisi), Turin to Lecce (calling at Alessandria, Voghera, Piacenza, Parma, Bologna, Rimini, Pescara, Termoli, San Severo, Foggia, Barletta, Bisceglie, Molfetta, Bari, Monopoli, Fasano, Ostuni and Brindisi) and Reggio di Calabria to Turin (calling at Naples, Rome, Livorno, La Spezia and Genova). Most portions of these ICN services run during the night; since most services take 10 to 15 hours to complete a one-way journey, their daytime portion provides extra train connections to complement the Intercity services.

== Regional trains ==
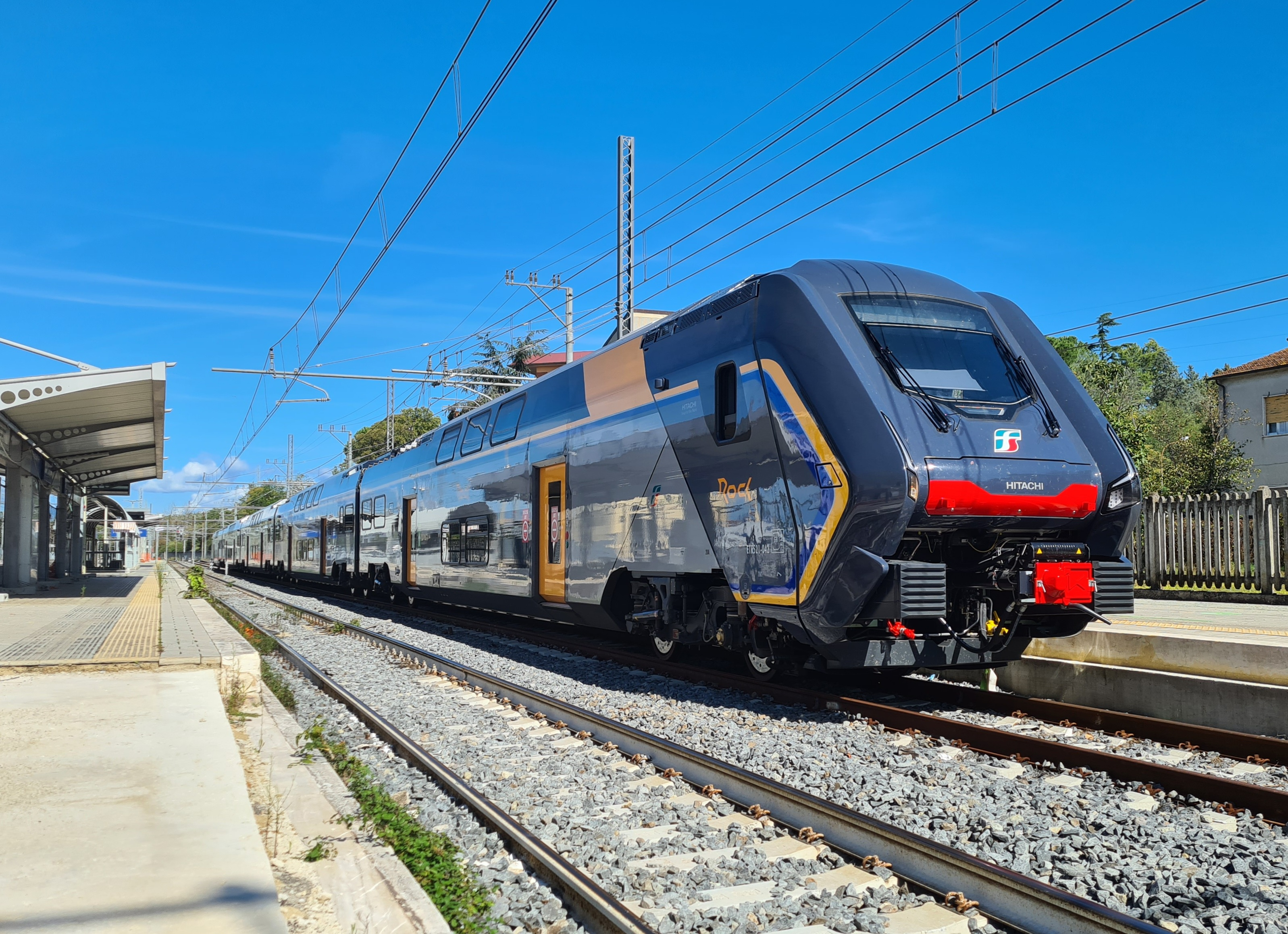
A Trenitalia ETR 521 "Rock" regional train on Florence–Rome railway at Fara Sabina-Montelibretti station

Trenitalia operates regional services (both fast veloce RV and stopping REG) throughout Italy.

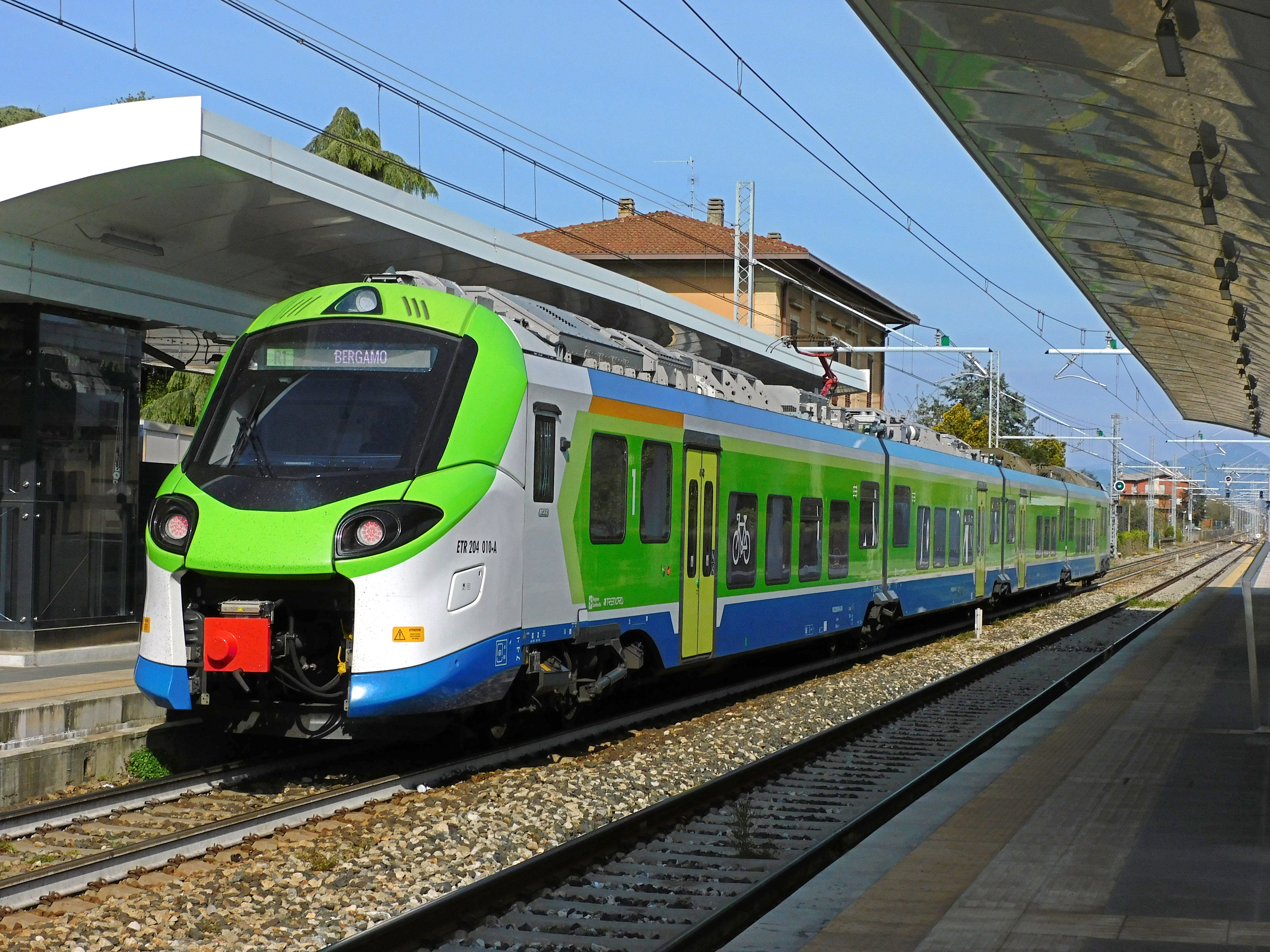
A Trenord Donizetti TN 204 arrives at Palazzolo sull'Oglio railway station

Regional train agencies exist: their train schedules are largely connected to and shown on Trenitalia, and tickets for such train services can be purchased through Trenitalia's national network. Other regional agencies have separate ticket systems which are not mutually exchangeable with that of Trenitalia. These "regional" tickets could be purchased at local newsagents or tobacco stores instead.

- Campania: Ente Autonomo Volturno (EAV) operates most regional and metropolitan rail services in Campania. EAV runs the Naples metropolitan railway service, including the Circumvesuviana lines (connecting Naples with Vesuvio-area towns such as Pompei, Ercolano, Sorrento and Sarno), the Cumana and the Circumflegrea railways. It also operates regional lines outside the metropolitan area, including the Alifana railway, the Benevento–Cancello railway.
- Trentino-Alto Adige / Trentin-Südtirol: Südtirol Bahn (lit. 'South Tyrol Railway') runs regional services on Ala/Ahl-am-Etsch to Bolzano/Bozen (calling at Rovereto/Rofreit, Trento/Trient and Mezzocorona/Kronmetz), Bolzano/Bozen to Merano/Meran, Bressanone/Brixen to San Candido/Innichen, and a direct "Tirol regional express REX" service between Bolzano/Bozen in Italy and Innsbruck in Austria.
- Veneto: Sistemi Territoriali runs regional trains in Veneto region.
- Lombardy: Trenord runs the Malpensa Express airport train, many Milan's suburban lines and most regional train services in Lombardy. Trenord also co-operates with DB and ÖBB on the EuroCity Verona-Munich service, and with SBB CFF FFS (joint-venture TiLo) on the regional express and suburban trains between Lombardy and the towns of Canton of Ticino, such as Lugano, Locarno, Cadenazzo, Bellinzona and Mendrisio.
- Emilia-Romagna: Trasporto Passeggeri Emilia-Romagna provides vital connections across cities on different mainline networks, including Modena, Parma, Suzzara, Ferrara, Reggio Emilia and Bologna.
- Tuscany: La Ferroviaria Italiana operates in Arezzo province.
- Abruzzo: Sangritana runs daily services between Pescara and Lanciano.

In addition to these agencies, there is a great deal of other little operators, such as AMT Genova for the Genova-Casella railway.

== Stations ==
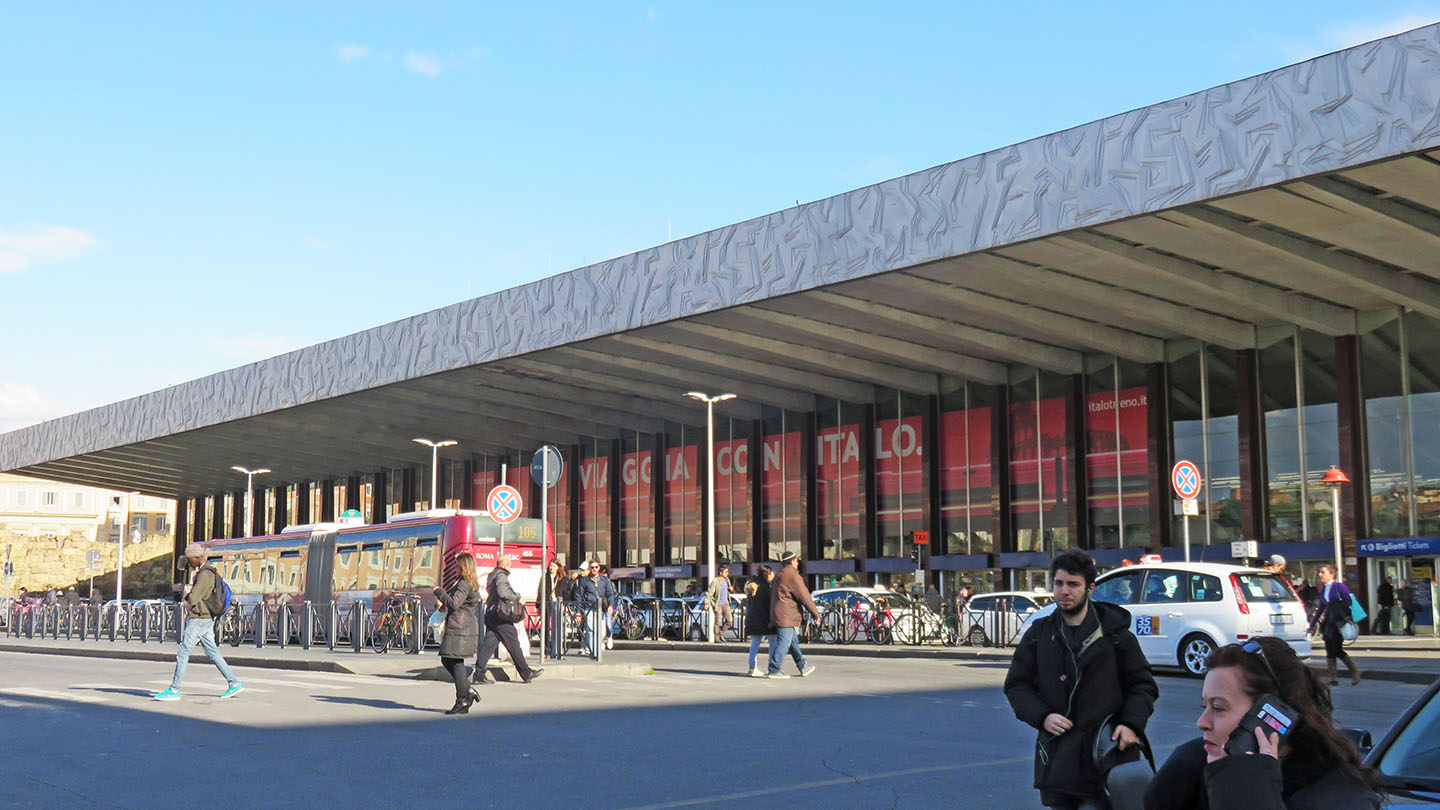
Roma Termini railway station

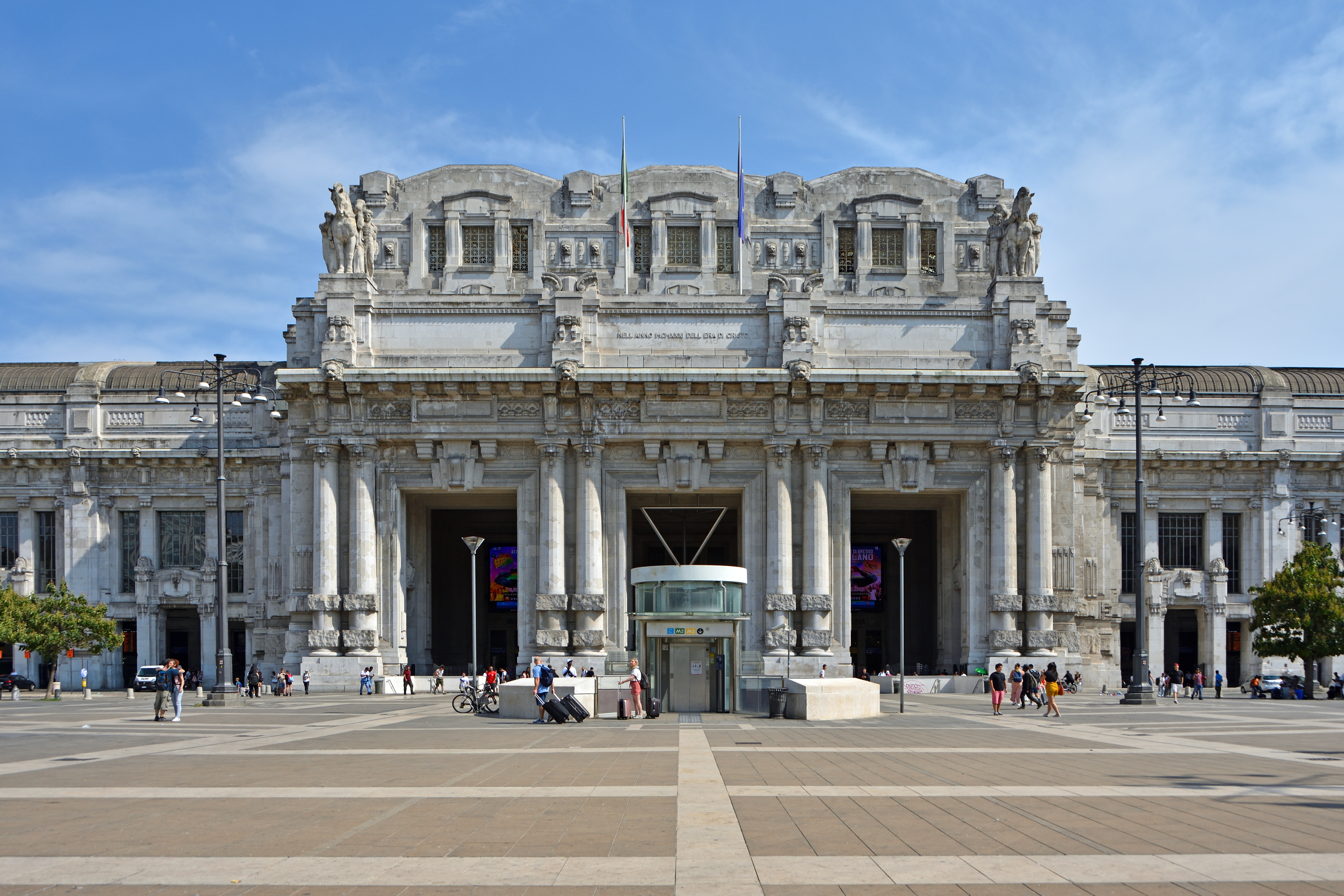
Milano Centrale railway station

Italy's top ten railway stations by annual passengers are:

Rank	Railway Station	Annual entries/exits (millions)	Number of platforms	City	Region
1	Roma Termini	150	32	Rome	Lazio
2	Milano Centrale	145	24	Milan	Lombardy
3	Torino Porta Nuova	70	20	Turin	Piedmont
4	Firenze Santa Maria Novella	59	19	Florence	Tuscany
5	Bologna Centrale	58	28	Bologna	Emilia-Romagna
6	Roma Tiburtina	51	20	Rome	Lazio
7	Napoli Centrale	50	25	Naples	Campania
8	Milano Cadorna	33.1	10	Milan	Lombardy
9	Venezia Mestre	31	13	Venice	Veneto
10	Venezia Santa Lucia	30	16	Venice	Veneto

== Rapid transit ==
=== Metro ===
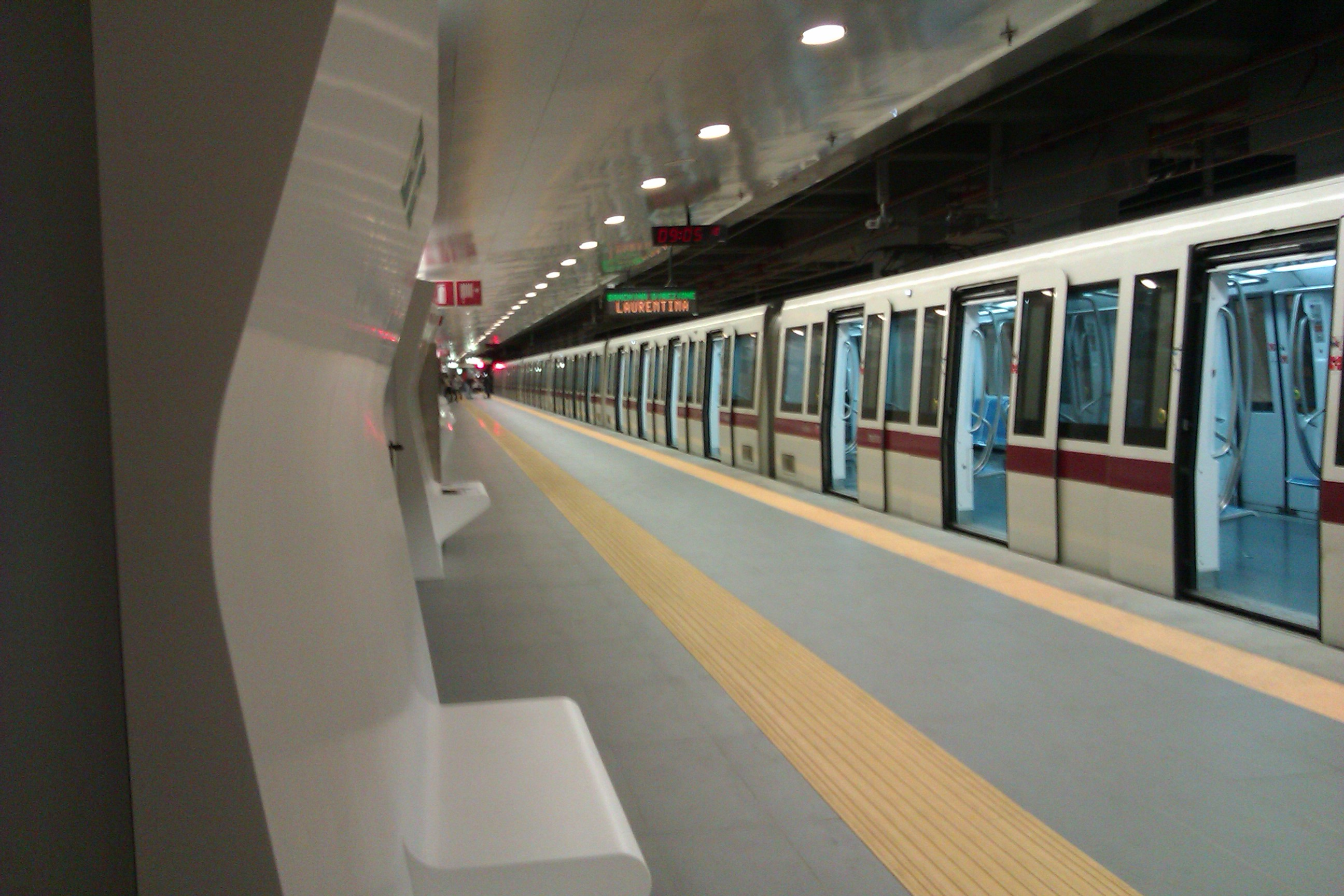
Rome Metro

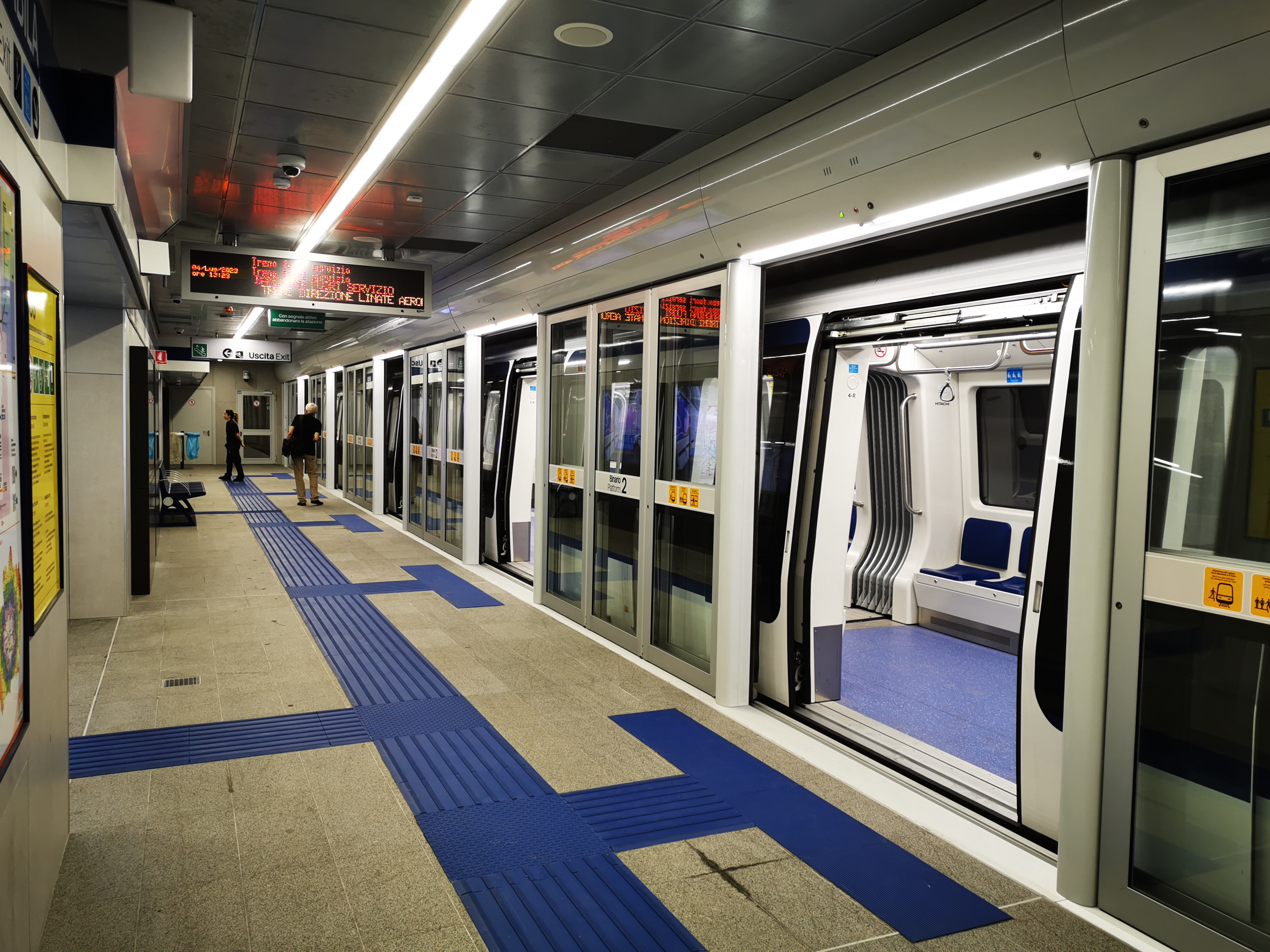
Milan Metro

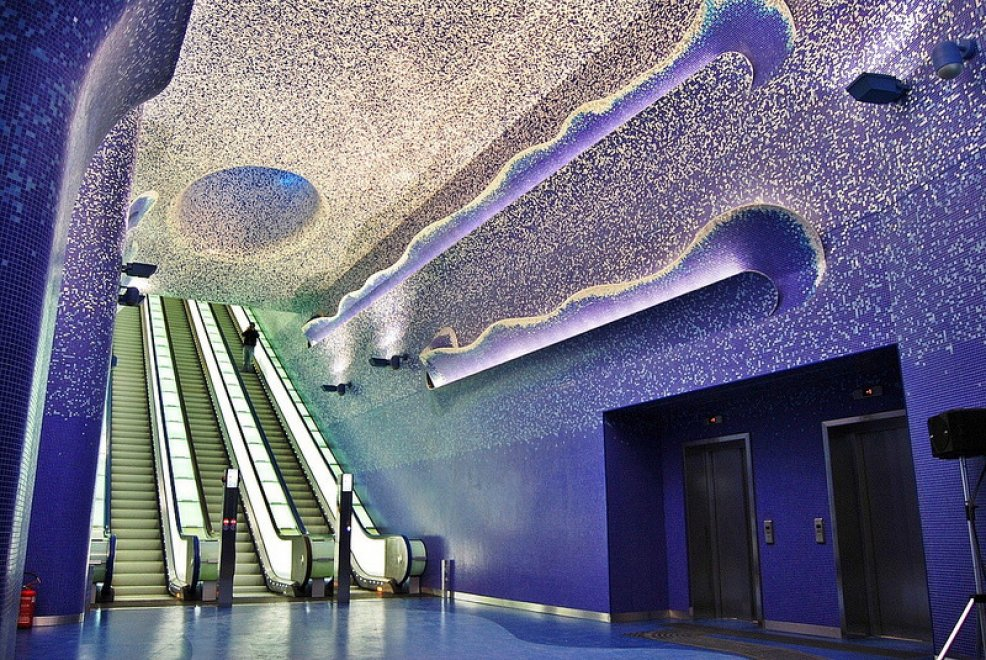
Naples Metro

Milan Metro is the largest rapid transit system in Italy in terms of length, number of stations and ridership; and the fifth longest in the European Union and the eighth in the Europe. Seven cities have metro systems:

City	Name	Lines	Length (km)	Stations	Opening
Brescia	Brescia Metro	1	13.7	17	2013
Catania	Catania Metro	1	8.8	10	1999
Genoa	Genoa Metro	1	7.1	8	1990
Milan	Milan Metro	5	102.5	119	1964
Naples	Naples Metro	3	36.4	31	1993
Rome	Rome Metro	3	60	75	1955
Turin	Turin Metro	1	15.1	23	2006

=== Commuter rail ===
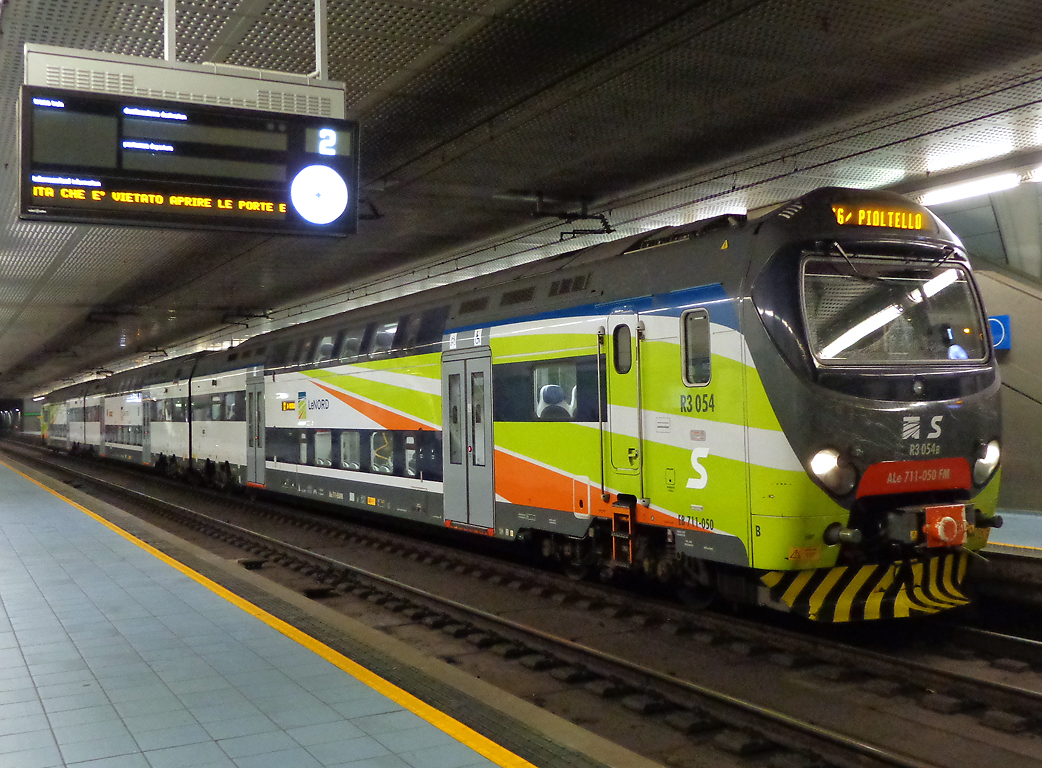
A TSR train at Milano Porta Venezia railway station on the Milan Passerby railway

15 cities have commuter rail systems; cities without wikilink are those listed just above for their metro rail system.

- Bari (Bari metropolitan railway service, 3 lines)
- Bologna (Bologna metropolitan railway service, 8 lines)
- Cagliari, 1 line
- Catanzaro, 2 lines
- Genoa (Genoa urban railway service, 3 lines)
- Messina, 1 line
- Milan (Milan suburban railway service, 12 lines)
- Naples (Naples metropolitan railway service, 8 lines)
- Palermo (Palermo metropolitan railway service, 2 lines)
- Perugia, 1 line
- Potenza, 1 line
- Reggio Calabria, 1 line
- Rome (FL lines, 8 lines)
- Salerno (Salerno metropolitan railway service, 1 line)
- Sassari, 4 lines
- Turin (Turin metropolitan railway service, 8 lines)

=== Airport shuttles ===
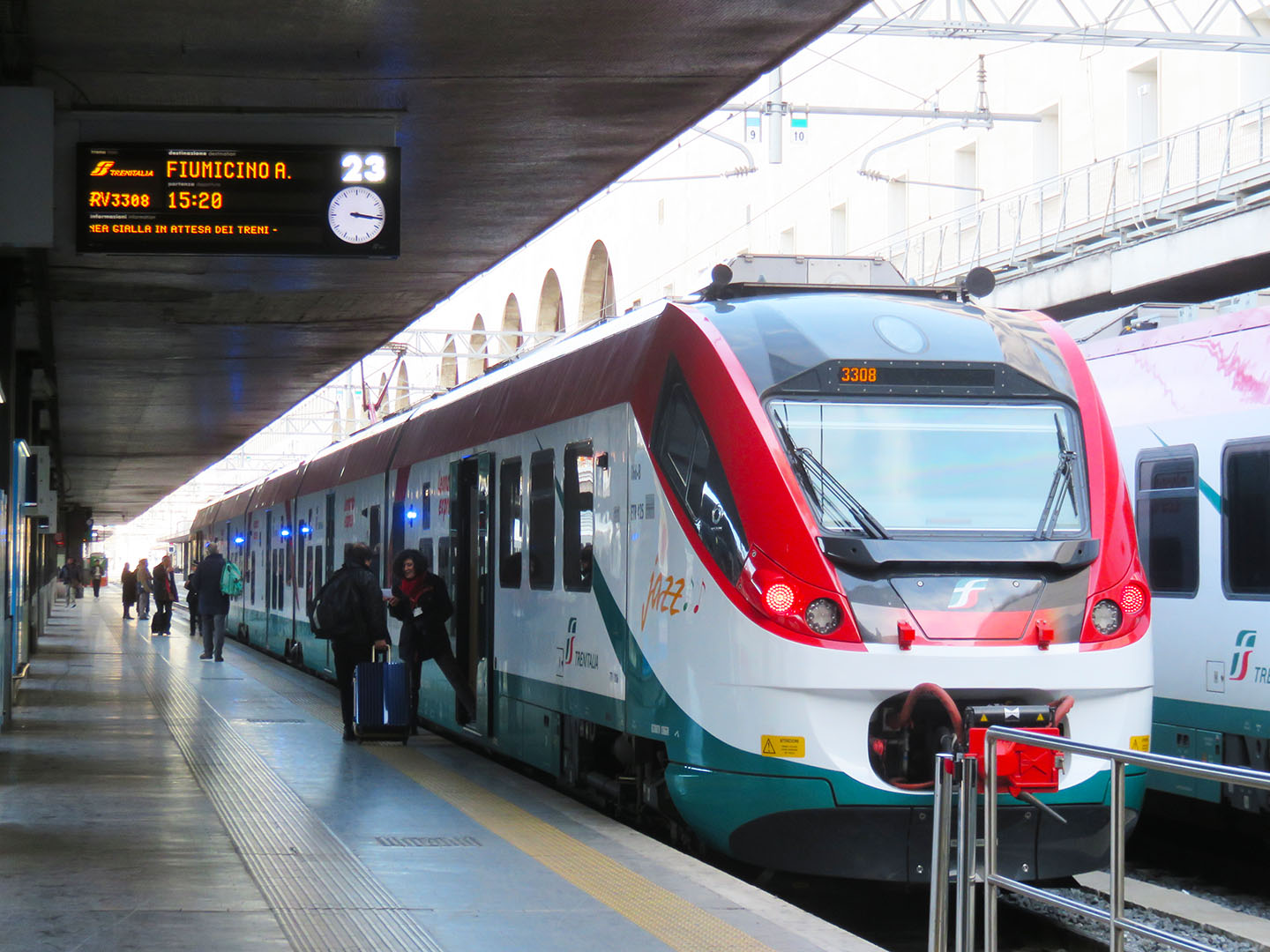
Leonardo Express at Roma Termini railway station

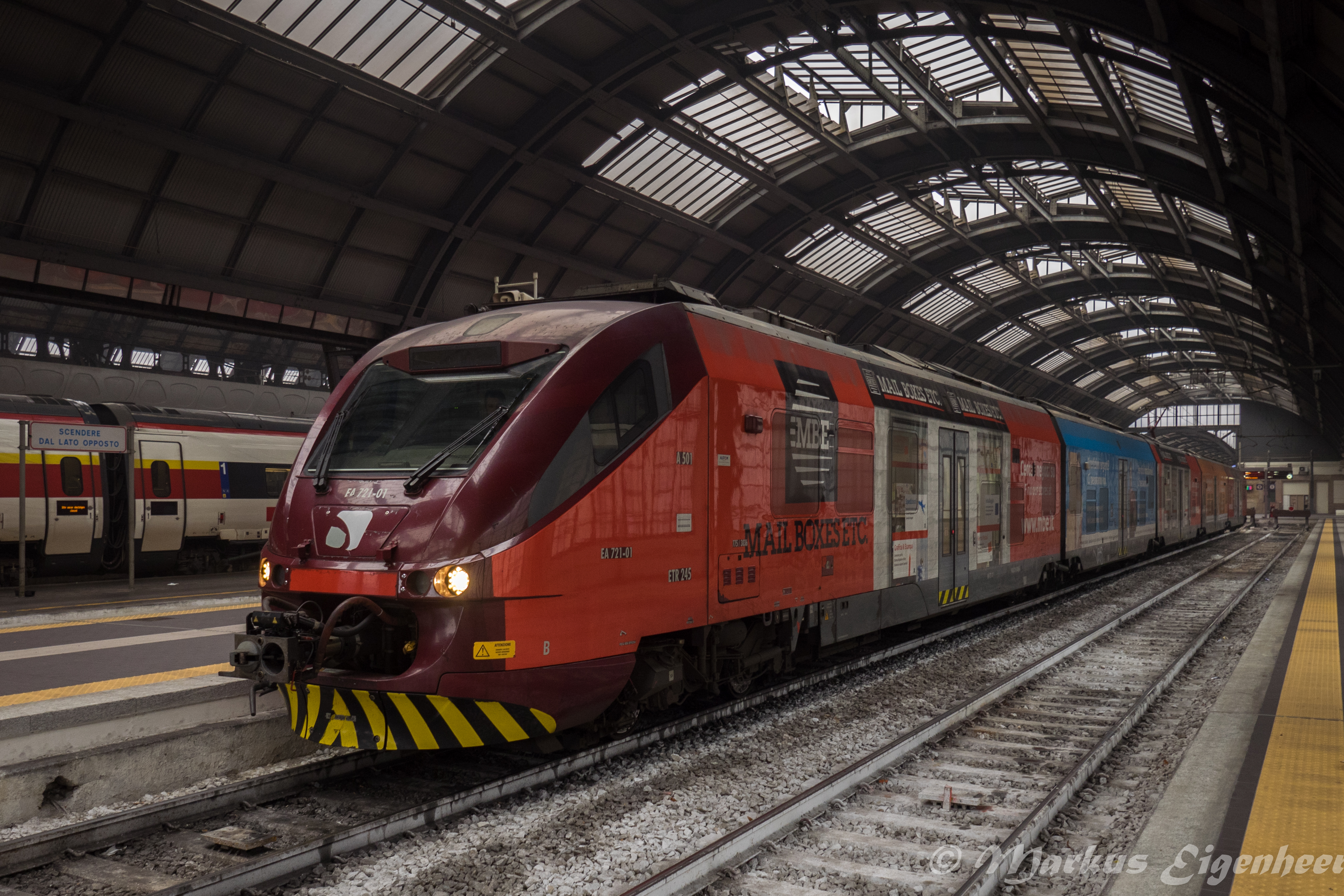
Malpensa Express at Milano Centrale railway station

Airport shuttle buses are highly developed and convenient for rail travellers. Most airports in Italy are not connected to the railway network, except for Rome Fiumicino Airport, Milan Malpensa Airport and Turin Caselle Airport. In Bologna, there is the monorail Marconi Express, connecting Bologna Airport to the main railway station. Linate Airport in Milan has been connected to line 4 of the Milan metro since 2022.

- Venice: Venezia-Mestre station - Marco Polo Airport (50 minutes) and Treviso Airport
- Milan: Milano Centrale station - Malpensa Airport (1 hour 5 minutes), Linate Airport (35 minutes) and Milan Bergamo Airport (1 hour)
- Brescia: Brescia station - Milan Bergamo Airport (1 hour)
- Rome: Rome Termini station - Fiumicino Airport (31 minutes)
- Verona: Verona Porta Nuova station - Villafranca "Catullo" Airport (20 minutes)
- Bologna: Centrale station - Bologna Airport (20 minutes) - Route modified in November 2020. It shifted from route BLQ (Bologna Centrale Station-Bologna Airport) to route 944 Ospedale Maggiore-Bologna Airport
- Pescara Centrale station - Abruzzo Airport (10 minutes)
- Pisa: Pisa Centrale station - San Giusto Airport (5 minutes)
- Florence: Firenze S M Novella station - Florence Airport

=== Tram ===
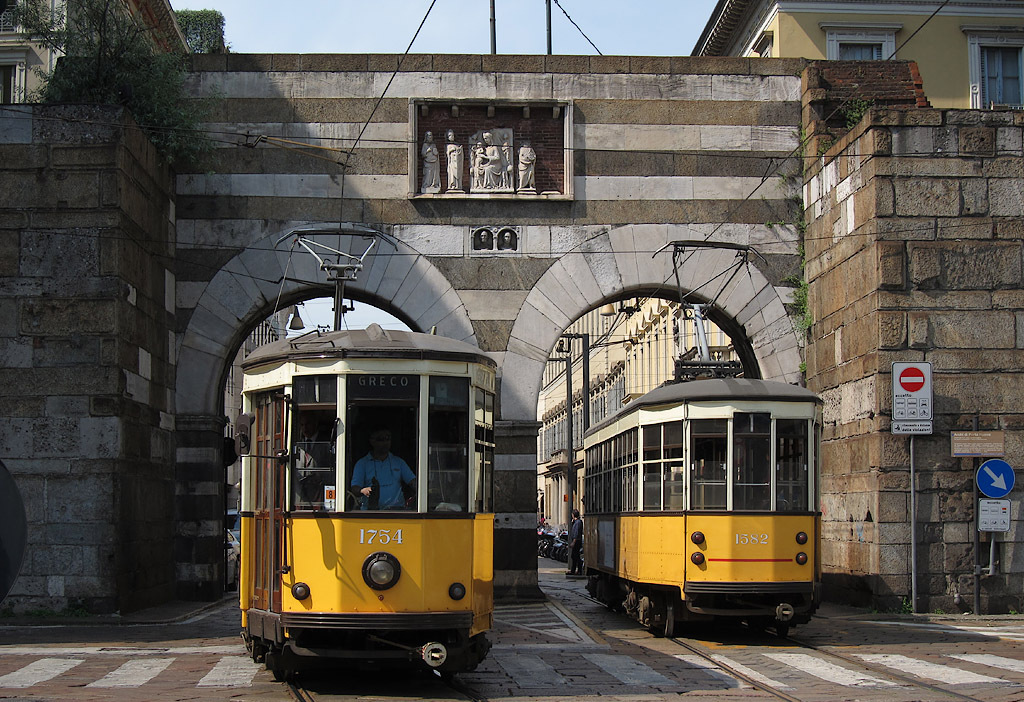
Intersecting trams in Milan under the arcs of Porta Nuova medieval gate. This type of historical tram is also used in San Francisco, United States

11 cities have tram system:

- Bergamo–Albino light rail
- Cagliari light rail
- Trams in Florence
- Trams in Messina
- Trams in Mestre
- Trams in Milan
- Trams in Naples
- Trams in Padua
- Trams in Palermo
- Trams in Rome
- Trams in Turin
- Trieste–Opicina tramway

=== Tram-train ===
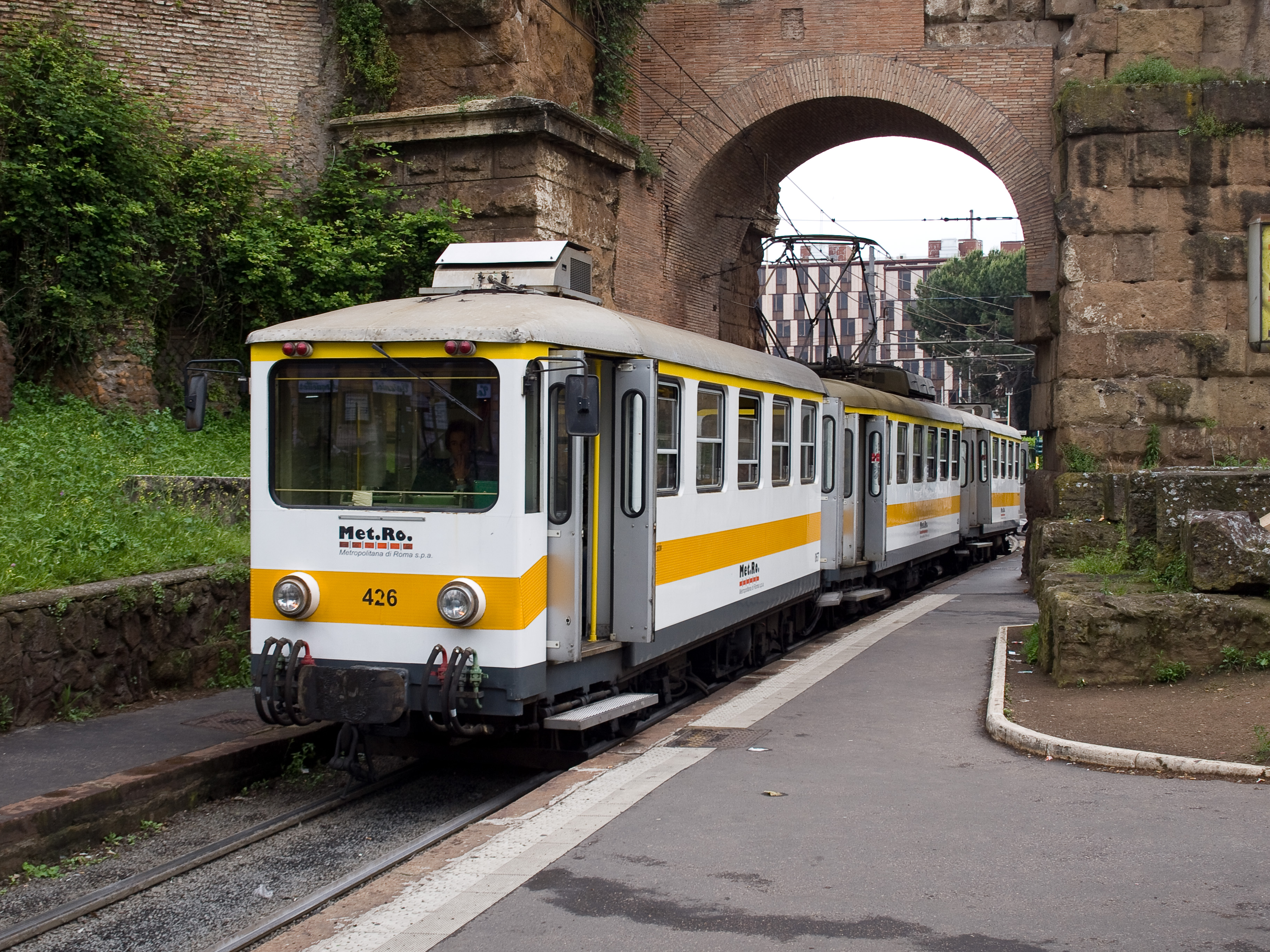
Rome–Giardinetti railway

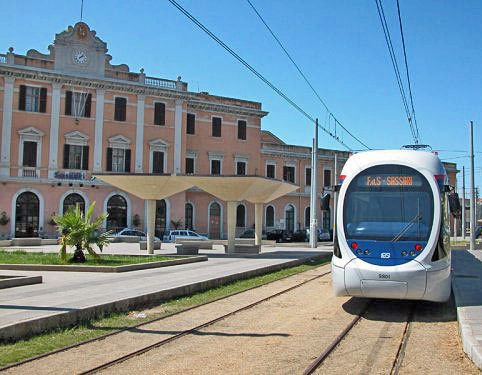
Metrosassari

2 cities have tram-train system, Rome and Sassari. The Rome–Giardinetti railway connects Laziali (a regional train station some 800 metres (2,625 ft) from Termini's main concourse) with Giardinetti to the east just past the Grande Raccordo Anulare, Rome's orbital motorway. It is run by ATAC, the company responsible for public transportation in the city, which also operates the Rome Metro. The present railway is the only part of the old and longer Rome–Fiuggi–Alatri–Frosinone railway to be in service. The latest shortening of the line occurred in 2008 with the closing of the Giardinetti–Pantano section, which has now become part of the Metro Line C. The line had been due to be dismantled in 2016 to be replaced with a bus lane along Via Casilina, but in March 2015 it was announced that the line would instead be retained and modernised.

Metrosassari, also called Sassari tramway, Sassari tram-train or Sassari metro-tramway (Italian: Metrotranvia di Sassari or Italian: Metropolitana leggera di Sassari) is the commercial name of a tram-train line in Sassari, Sardinia, Italy, operated by the regional public transport company ARST (Azienda Regionale Sarda Trasporti). Despite having been built in the early 2000s, in the urban section the line was built with single track and narrow gauge, to connect with the same 950 mm (3 ft 1 3/8 in) gauge used in the secondary railway lines in Sardinia. The 2.45 km (1.52 mi) tramway part of the line (Stazione - Emiciclo Garibaldi) opened in October 2006, linking the railway station with the city centre via the hospital district. On 27 September 2009 the line was extended into the peripheral district of Santa Maria di Pisa, running on the electrified portion of the Sassari–Sorso railway. The main part of the network was in 2013 in the advanced development phase. It is under construction is the extension of the line from Santa Maria di Pisa to Li Punti and Baldinca, and the electrification of the railway to Sorso, 10 km from Sassari. It is also planned to convert and electrify the 28 km Sassari-Alghero railway to allow the trams to reach the village of Olmedo, Fertilia Airport and the town of Alghero.

== Rail links to adjacent countries ==
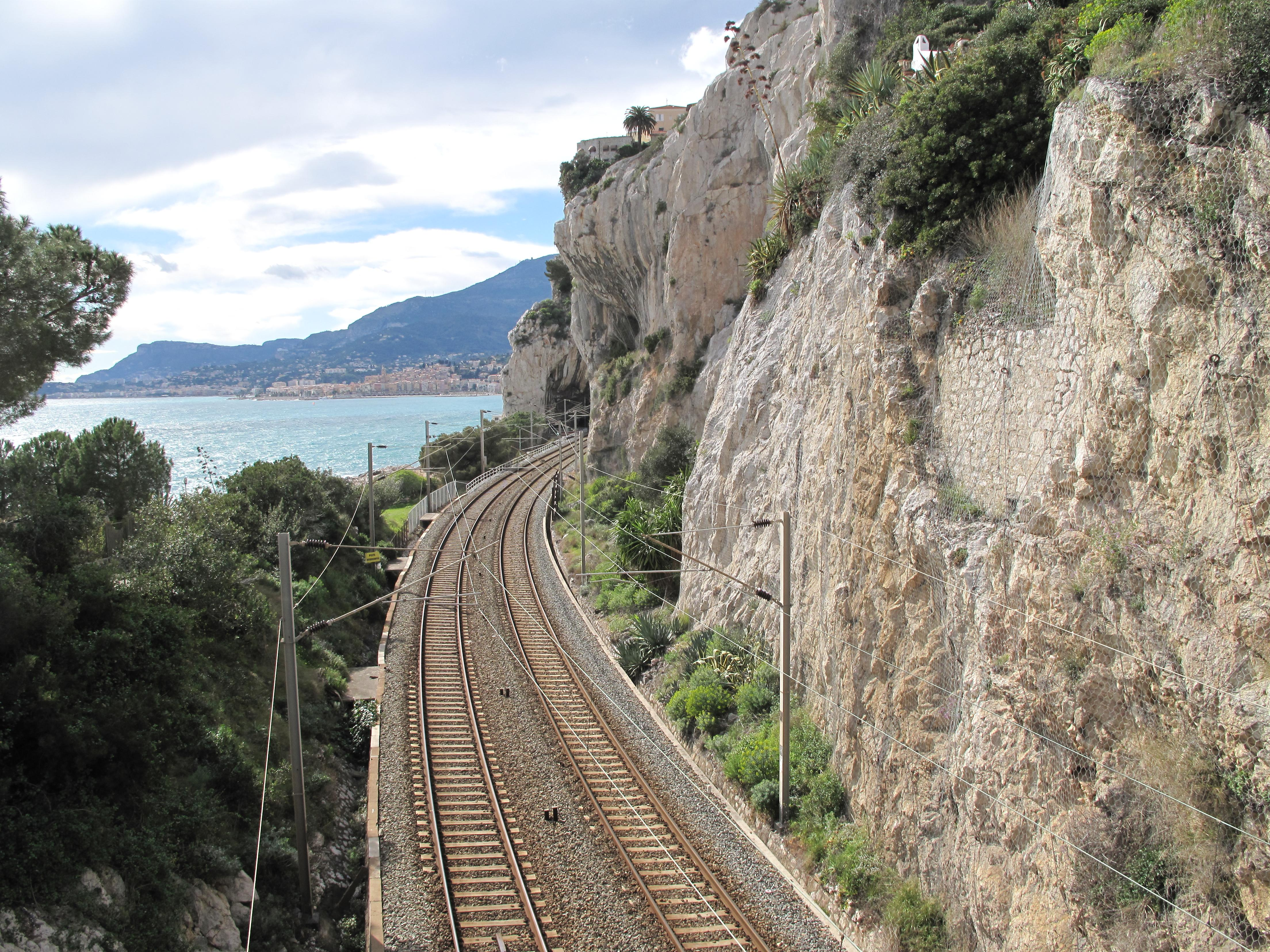
The Marseille-Ventimiglia railway line in Ventimiglia, near the French border

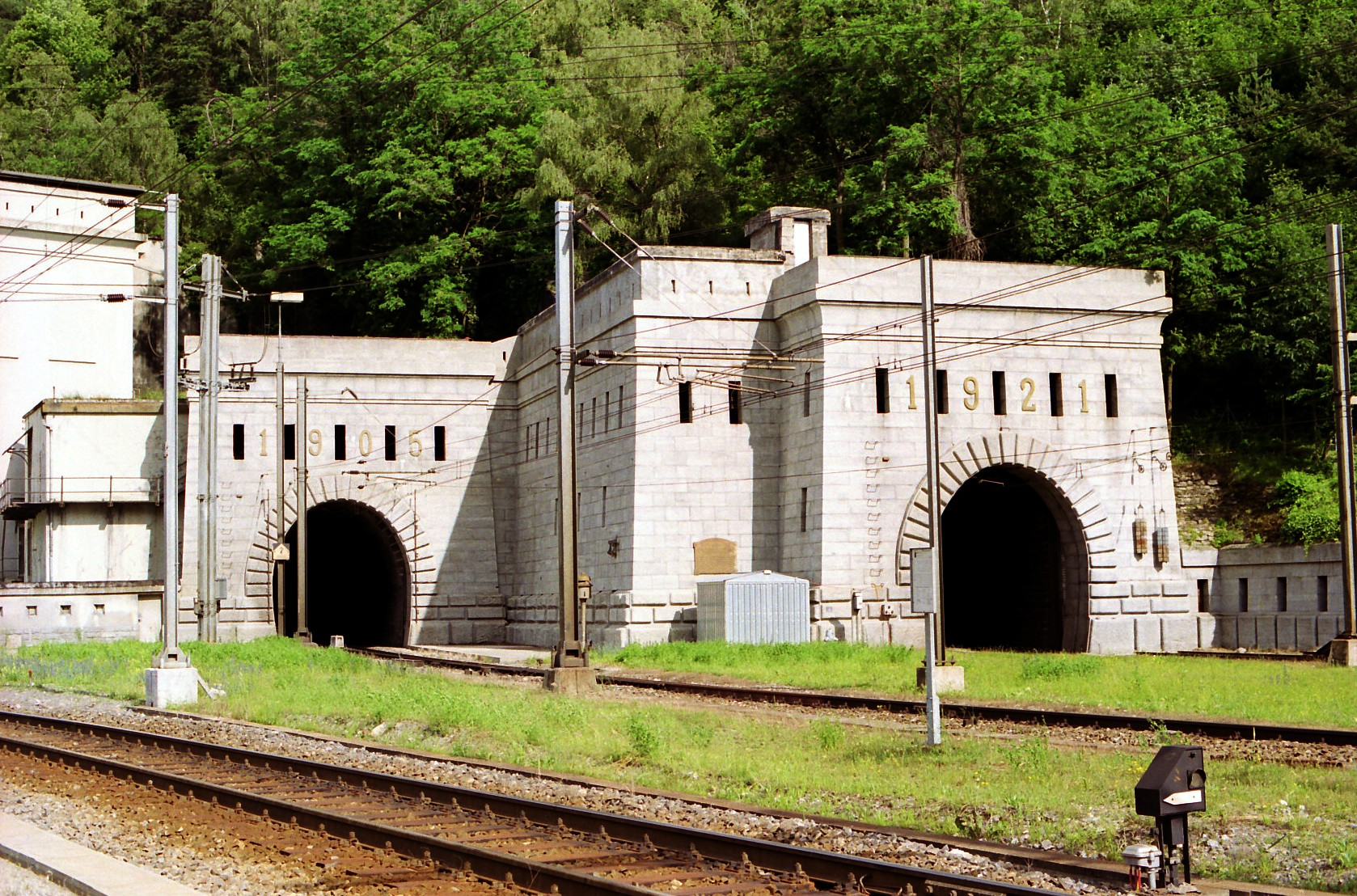
Simplon Tunnel is a railway tunnel on the Simplon railway that connects Brig, Switzerland and Domodossola, Italy, through the Alps.

Italy has 11 rail border crossings over the Alpine mountains with her neighbouring countries: six are designated as mainline tracks and two are metre-gauge tracks. The six mainline border crossings are: two with France (one for Nice and Marseille; the other for Lyon and Dijon), two with Switzerland (one for Brig, Bern and Geneva; the other for Chiasso, Lugano, Lucerne and Zürich), and two with Austria (one for Innsbruck; the other for Villach, Graz and Vienna). The two-metre-gauge track crossings are located at the border town of Tirano (enters Switzerland's Canton Graubünden/Grisons) and Domodossola (enters Switzerland's canton of Ticino).

There was a railway line connecting Italy's northeastern port of Trieste to Ljubljana (Slovenia) and Vienna, built when Trieste was part of the Austro-Hungarian Empire:the Austrian Southern Railway. This railway stopped operating at the end of World War II.Direct connections between Trieste and Ljubljana have resumed since September 2018.

- Italy-France: Marseille-Ventimiglia railway, usually a change of train is required in Ventimiglia (former direct Milan-Marseille services by Thello do not run anymore since 2019)
- Italy-France: Tenda line, operated by Trenitalia
- Italy-France: Fréjus Rail Tunnel at 1,338 m (4,390 ft) above sea, currently SNCF TGV trains Milan-Paris via Turin, as well as Trenitalia Frecciarossa trains on the same line
- Italy-Switzerland: Simplon Tunnel, currently EuroCity (EC) trains of SBB CFF FFS Milan-Geneva and Milan-Bern
- Italy-Switzerland: Domodossola–Locarno railway line line connecting Domodossola (Italy) with Locarno (Switzerland), operated by Ferrovie Autolinee Regionali Ticinesi SA (FART)
- Italy-Switzerland: Cadenazzo–Luino railway line connecting Luino (Italy) to Bellinzona (Switzerland) and runs on the eastern coast of Lake Maggiore, operated by TILO regional trains
- Italy-Switzerland: Mendrisio–Varese railway line connecting Varese (Italy) to Mendrisio (Switzerland), operated by TILO regional trains
- Italy-Switzerland: Milan–Chiasso railway, currently EuroCity trains of SBB CFF FFS Milan-Zürich
- Italy-Switzerland: Bernina railway at 2,253 m (7,392 ft) above sea, metre-gauge trains of RhB Tirano-St. Moritz and the Bernina Express tourist train
- Italy-Austria: Brenner railway at 1,371 m (4,498 ft) above sea, currently EuroCity trains of ÖBB-DB Munich-Verona and Munich-Venice/Bologna, and ÖBB Nightjet Munich-Rome/Milan
- Italy-Austria: Drava Valley Railway at 1,175 m (3,855 ft) above sea connecting San Candido/Innichen (Italy) and Lienz (Austria)
- Italy-Austria: Rudolf Railway connecting Venice and Udine (Italy) to Villach (Austria), currently EuroCity trains of ÖBB Venice-Vienna, Nightjet trains of ÖBB Vienna-Rome/Milan/Venice/La Spezia
- Italy-Slovenia: Tarvisio–Ljubljana Railway, Trieste-Ljubljana
- Italy-Slovenia-Croatia:Trieste-Rijeka

The Vatican City is also linked to Italy with a railway line serving a single railway station, the Vatican City railway station. This line is used only for special occasions. San Marino used to have a narrow gauge rail connection with Italy; this was dismantled in 1944.

All links have the same gauge.

- Austria — voltage change 3 kV DC/15 kV AC
- France — voltage change 3 kV DC/25 kV AC or 1.5 kV DC
- Slovenia — same voltage
- Switzerland — voltage change 3 kV DC/15 kV AC (plus two narrow gauge lines, same voltage)
- Vatican City — no electrification
- San Marino — closed, narrow gauge

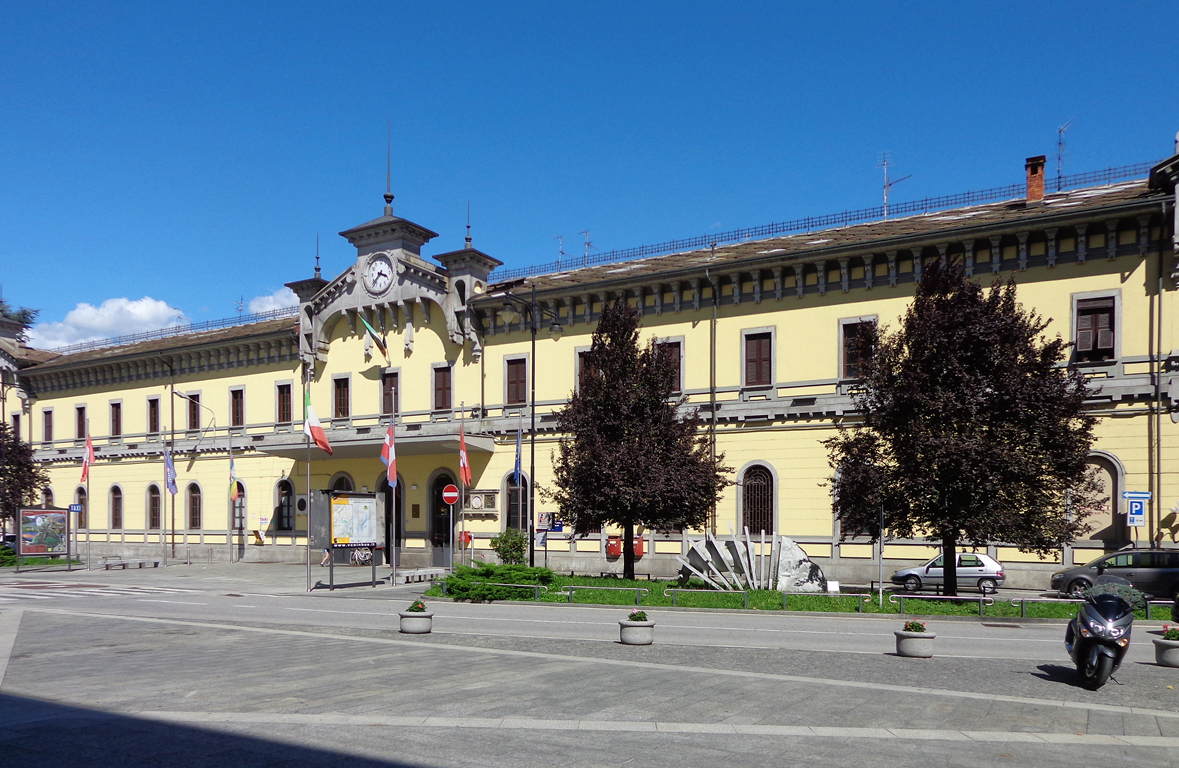
Domodossola railway station

Stations on the border are:

- Roma San Pietro is the border station of the Rome-Vatican City railway
- Ventimiglia is the border station on the Genoa-Nice main line.
- Olivetta San Michele and Limone Piemonte on both sides of the Tenda Railway
- Modane is the border station on the Turin-Lyon main line (Fréjus Tunnel line).
- Domodossola is the border station of the Milan-Bern/Geneva main line (Simplon Tunnel line).
- Ribellasca is on the Vigezzina.
- Luino is the border station of the Oleggio–Pino railway.
- Chiasso is the border station of the Milan-Zürich main line (Gotthard Tunnel line).
- Tirano is the terminus on the Italian side of the 1,000 mm (3 ft 3 3/8 in) Bernina line of the Rhätische Bahn.
- Brenner is the border station of the Verona-Innsbruck main line (Brenner railway).
- San Candido is the border station of the Fortezza-Lienz secondary line.
- Tarvisio Boscoverde is the border station of the Venezia-Wien main line (Austrian Southern Railway line).
- Gorizia Centrale station serves as link to the Slovenian Railways, through the station of Nova Gorica, which can be entered also directly by pedestrians from the Italian side.
- Villa Opicina (Villa Opicina, Trieste) serves as link to the Slovenian Railways, through the stations of Sežana and Repentabor.

== Heritage railways ==
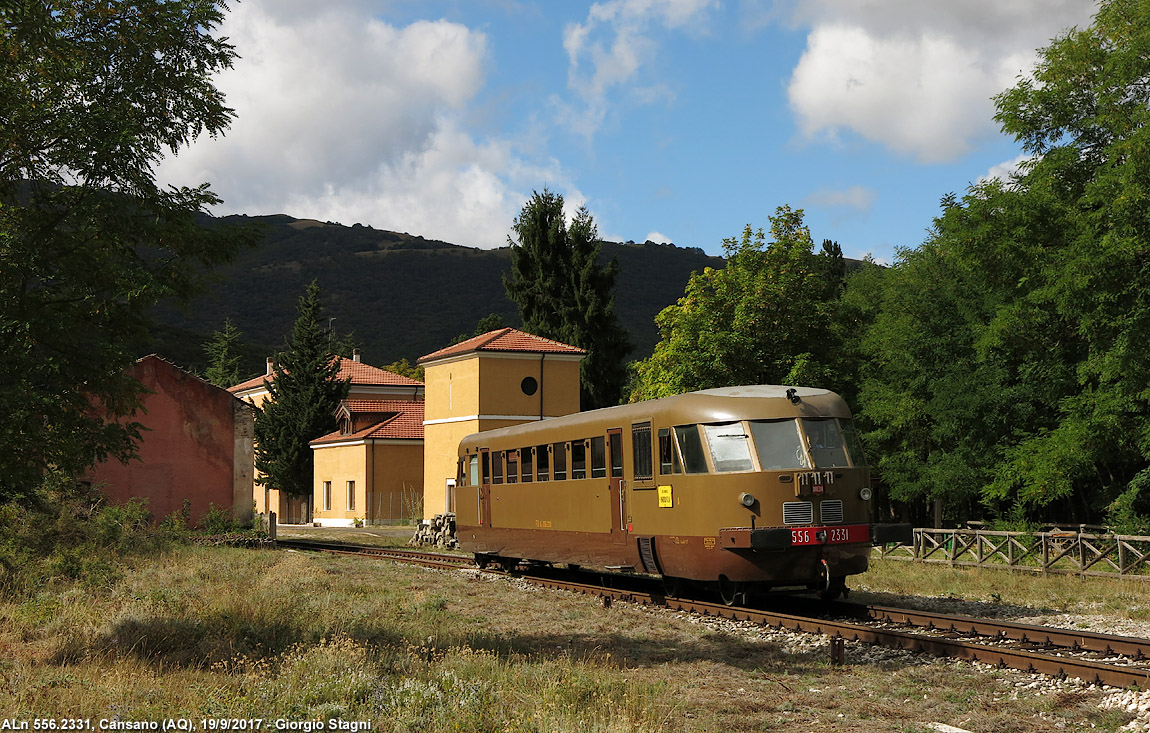
Historic train at the Cansano railway station, along the now tourist Sulmona–Isernia railway in Italy

In Italy, the heritage railways institute is recognized and protected by law no. 128 of 9 August 2017, which has as its objective the protection and valorisation of disused, suspended or abolished railway lines, of particular cultural, landscape and tourist value, including both railway routes and stations and the related works of art and appurtenances, on which, upon the proposal of the regions to which they belong, tourism-type traffic management is applied (art. 2, paragraph 1). At the same time, the law identified a first list of 18 tourist railways, considered to be of particular value (art. 2, paragraph 2).

The list is periodically updated by decree of the Ministry of Infrastructure and Transport, in agreement with the Ministry of Economy and Finance and the Ministry of Culture, also taking into account the reports in the State-Regions Conference, a list which in 2022 reached 26 railway lines. According to article 1, law 128/2017 has as its purpose: "the protection and valorisation of railway sections of particular cultural, landscape and tourist value, which include railway routes, stations and related works of art and appurtenances, and of the historic and tourist rolling stock authorized to travel along them, as well as the regulation of the use of ferrocycles".

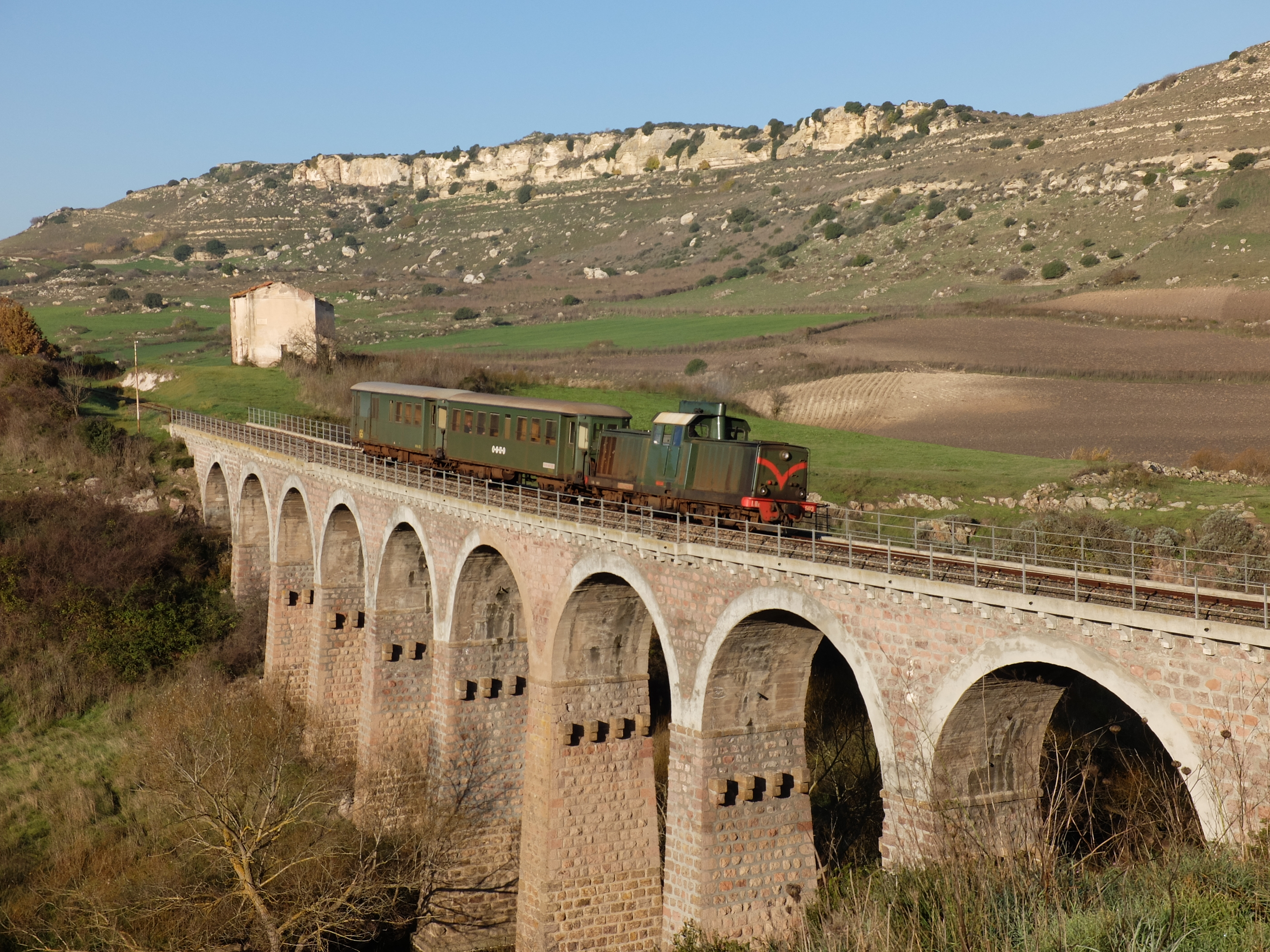
Tourist train in transit on a viaduct of the Sassari–Tempio–Palau railway in Italy

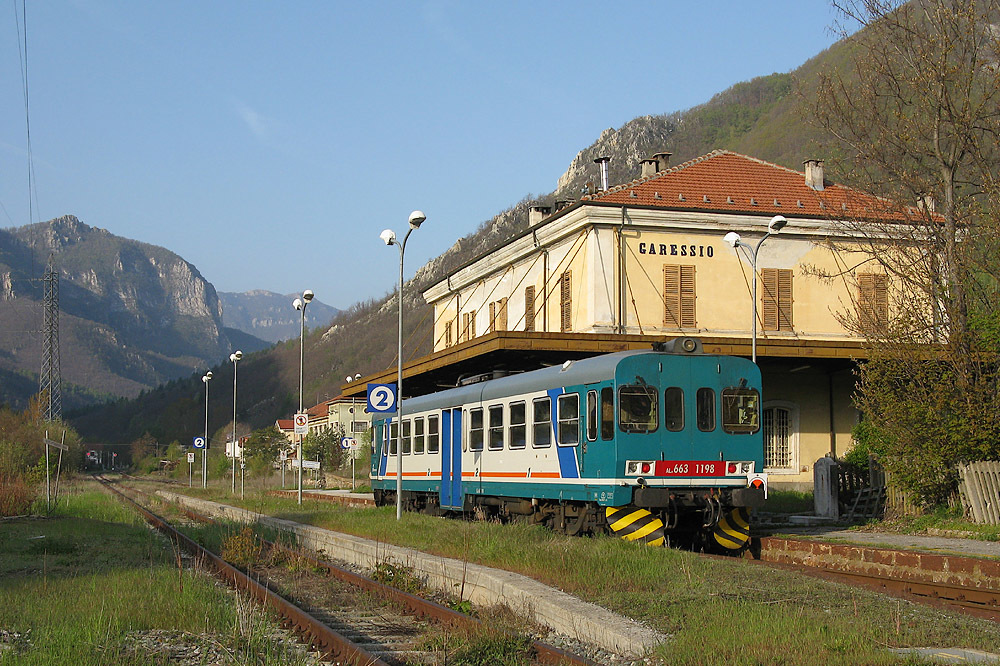
Tourist train in transit on the Ceva–Ormea railway in Italy

Below is the list of railway lines recognized as tourist railways by Italian legislation.

a) pursuant to art. 2 paragraph 2 law 128/2017:
1. Sulmona-Castel di Sangro section of the Sulmona–Isernia railway
2. Cosenza-Camigliatello–San Giovanni in Fiore railway
3. Avellino–Rocchetta Sant'Antonio railway
4. Gemona del Friuli–Sacile railway
5. Palazzolo–Paratico railway
6. Castel di Sangro-Carpinone section of the Sulmona-Isernia railway
7. Ceva–Ormea railway
8. Mandas–Arbatax railway
9. Isili–Sorgono railway
10. Sassari–Tempio-Palau railway
11. Macomer–Bosa railway
12. Alcantara–Randazzo railway
13. Castelvetrano-Porto Palo section of the Castelvetrano–Porto Empedocle railway
14. Agrigento Bassa-Porto Empedocle section of the Castelvetrano-Porto Empedocle railway
15. Noto–Pachino railway
16. Asciano–Monte Antico railway
17. Civitavecchia–Orte railway
18. Fano–Urbino railway

b) pursuant to the Ministerial Decree of 30 March 2022:

1. Chivasso–Asti railway
2. Castagnole–Asti-Mortara railway
3. Alba-Nizza Monferrato section of the Alessandria–Cavallermaggiore railway
4. Novara–Varallo railway
5. Fabriano-Pergola section of the Urbino–Fabriano railway
6. Sicignano degli Alburni–Lagonegro railway
7. Rocchetta Sant'Antonio–Gioia del Colle railway
8. Cuneo–Mondovì railway
9. Malnate Olona-Swiss border section of the Valmorea railway.

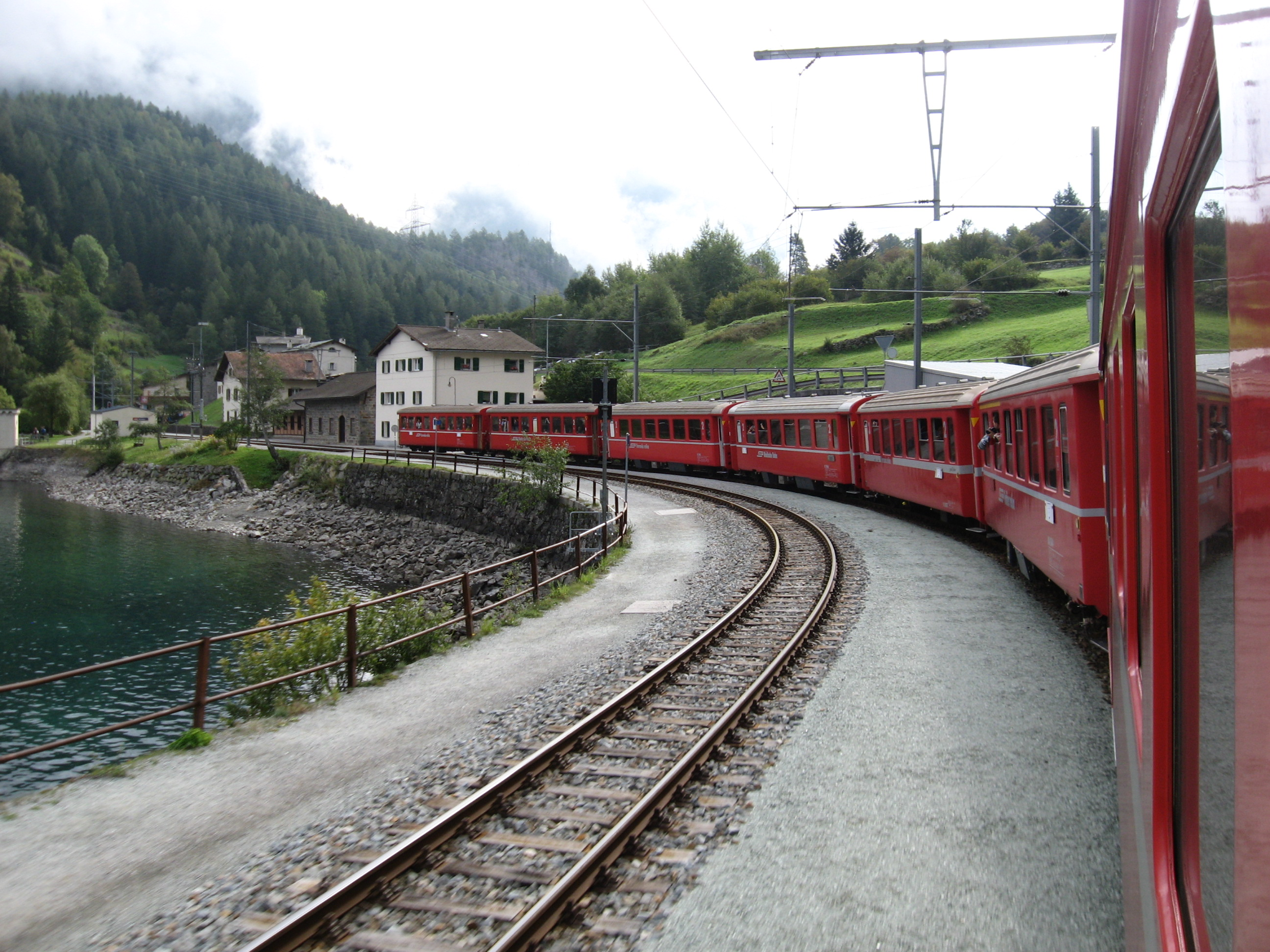
Bernina railway line between Poschiavo, Switzerland, and Tirano, Italy

The Bernina railway line is a single-track 1,000 mm (3 ft 3 3/8 in) metre gauge railway line forming part of the Rhaetian Railway (RhB). It links the spa resort of St. Moritz, in the canton of Graubünden, Switzerland, with the town of Tirano, in the Province of Sondrio, Italy, via the Bernina Pass. Reaching a height of 2,253 metres (7,392 ft) above sea level, it is the third highest railway crossing in Europe. It also ranks as the highest adhesion railway of the continent, and – with inclines of up to 7% – as one of the steepest adhesion railways in the world. The elevation difference on the section between the Bernina Pass and Tirano is 1,824 m (5,984 ft), allowing passengers to view glaciers along the line. On 7 July 2008, the Bernina line and the Albula railway line, which also forms part of the RhB, were recorded in the list of UNESCO World Heritage Sites, under the name Rhaetian Railway in the Albula / Bernina Landscapes. The whole site is a cross-border joint Swiss-Italian heritage area. Trains operating on the Bernina line include the Bernina Express.

In July 2023, Ferrovie dello Stato established a new company, the "FS Treni Turistici Italiani" (English: FS Italian Tourist Trains), with the mission "to propose an offer of railway services expressly designed and calibrated for quality, sustainable tourism and attentive to rediscovering the riches of the Italian territory. Tourism that can experience the train journey as an integral moment of the holiday, an element of quality in the overall tourist experience". There are three service areas proposed:

- Luxury trains, which includes the circulation of the "Orient Express - La Dolce Vita" from 2024, and Venice Simplon Orient Express, already operating on European routes;
- Express and historic trains, with the express trains of the 1980s and 1990s being redeveloped and modernized in the railway workshops of Rimini, while the historic trains are used for journeys that include stops with guided tours and tastings;
- Regional trains, also with trips that include experiential tourist stops, which pass through places rich in history, with villages and areas of landscape, naturalistic, food and wine and agri-food interest.

== Funding ==
The Italian railways are partially funded by the government, receiving €8.1 billion in 2009.

== Categories and types of trains ==
These are the major service categories and models of Italian trains.

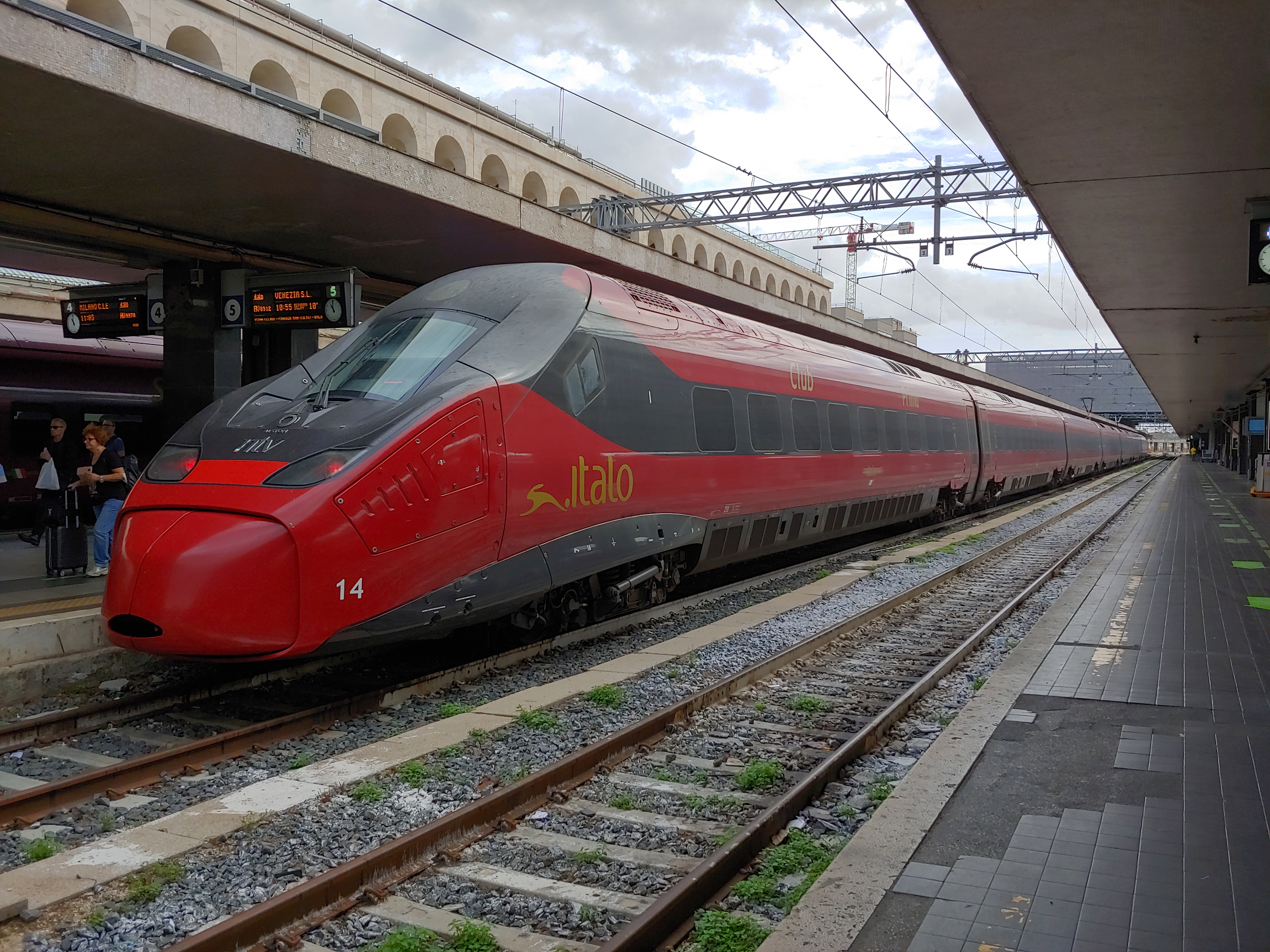
Italo operates on main High-Speed lines by Italo NTV. Makes a few stops in the most important cities.

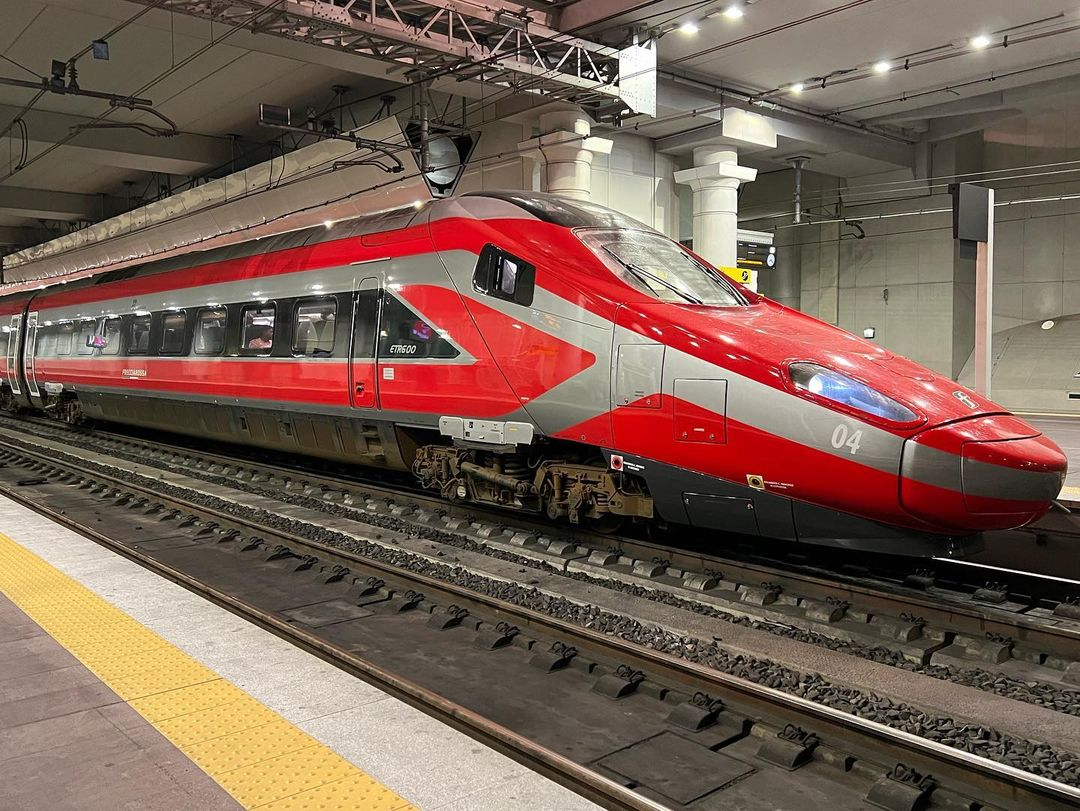
Frecciarossa operates on High-Speed lines by Trenitalia. Makes a few stops in major cities.

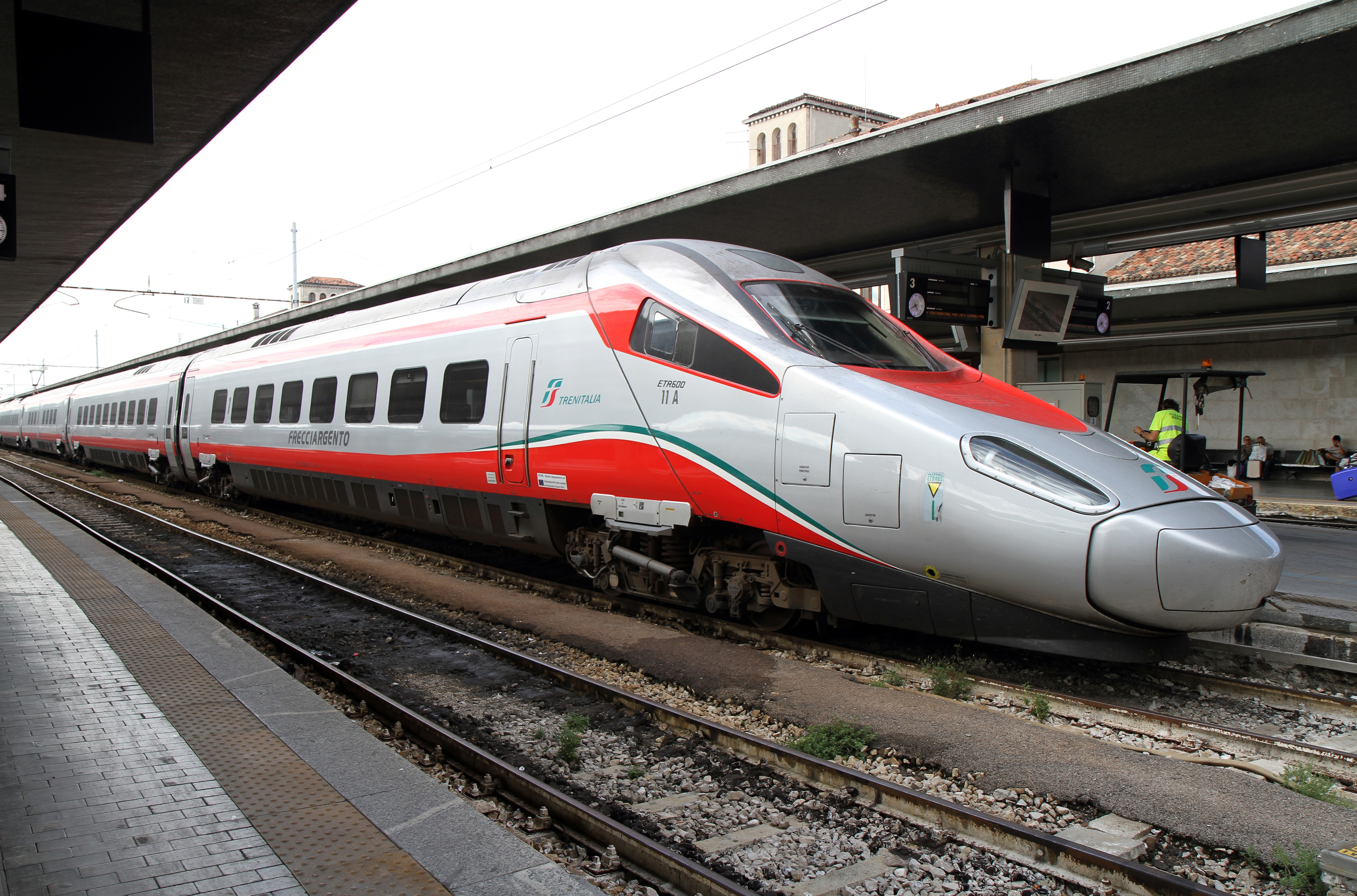
Frecciargento operates on High-Speed lines by Trenitalia. Makes some stops in big cities.

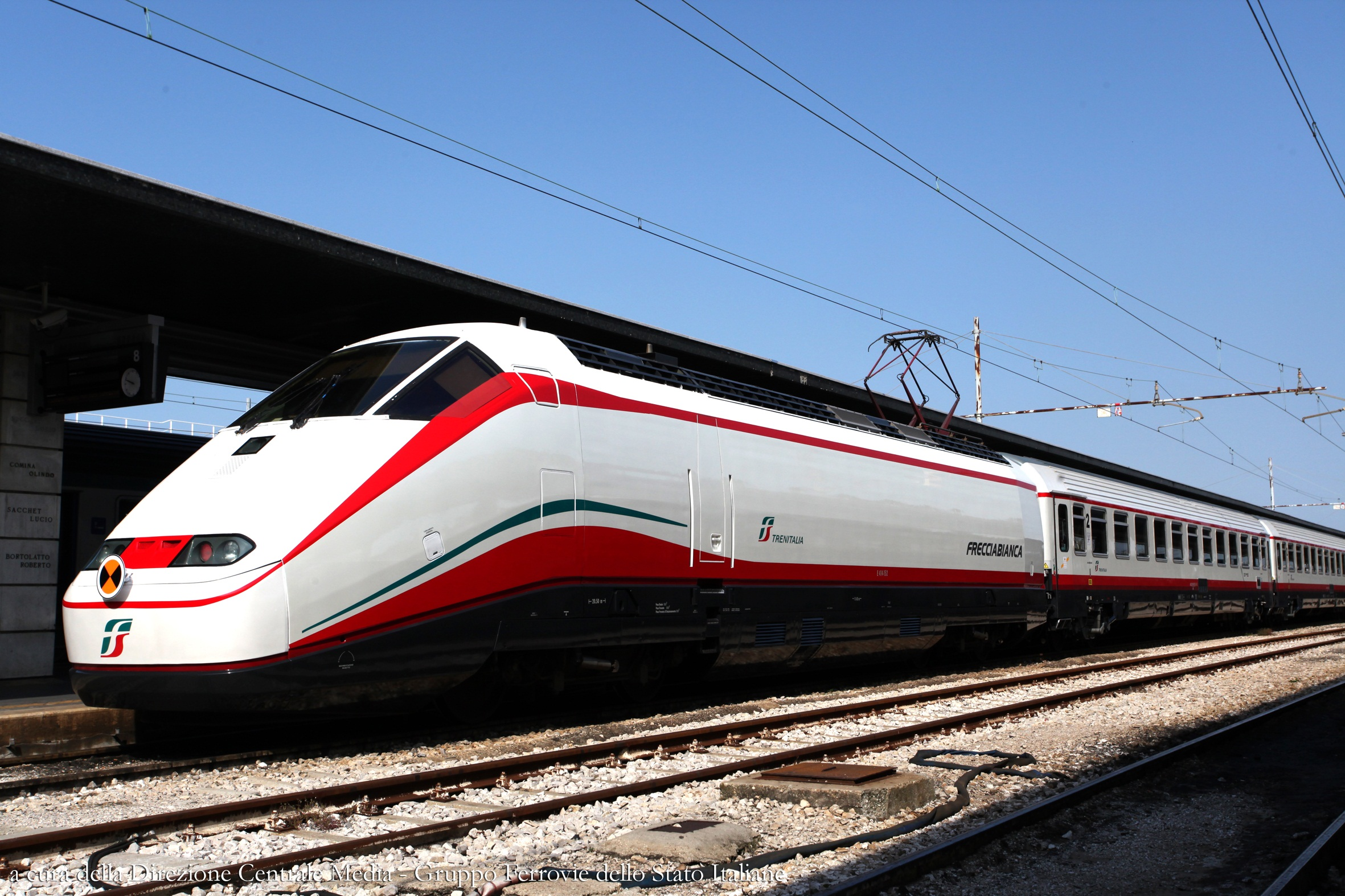
Frecciabianca operates on main lines by Trenitalia. Stops in big cities.

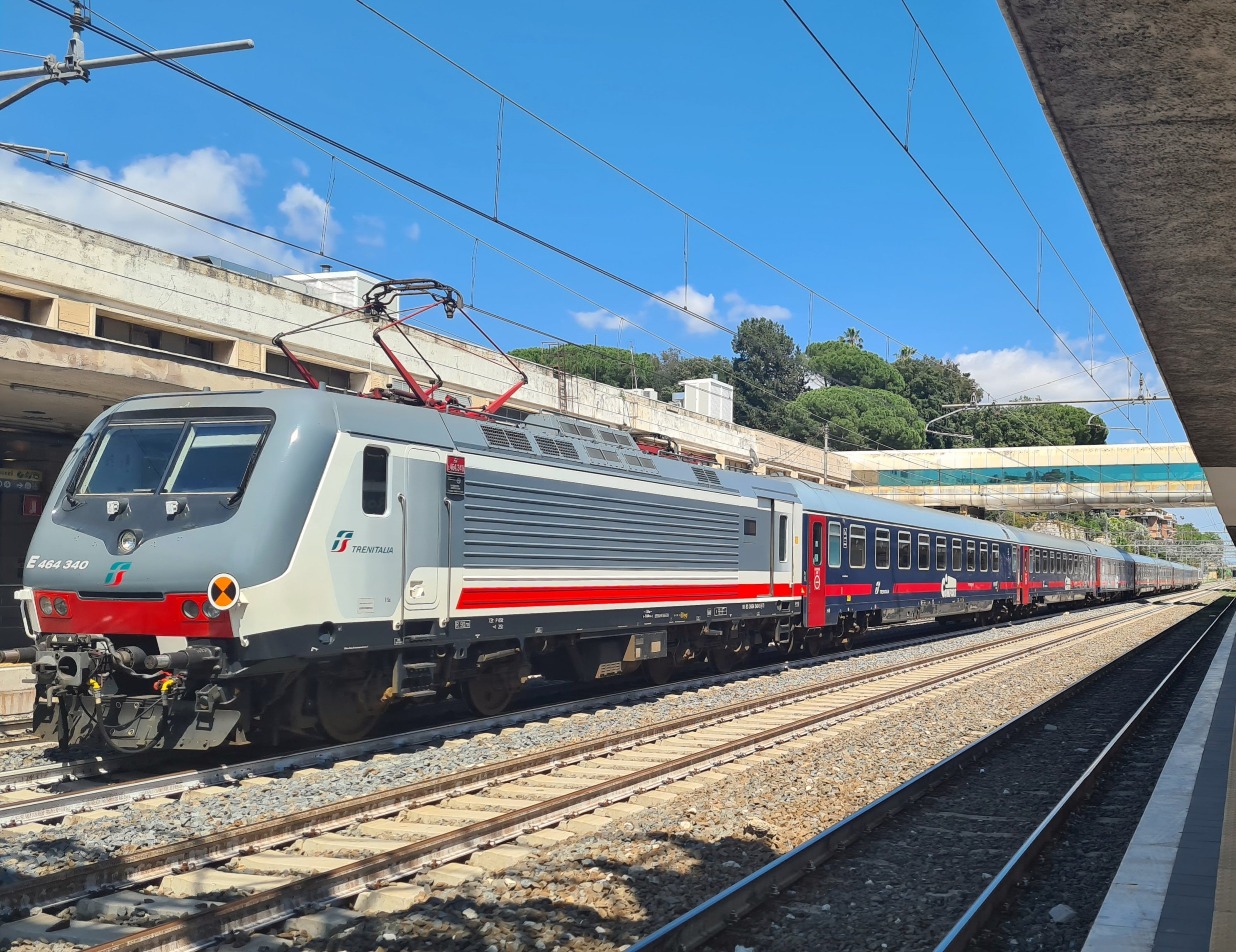
Intercity operates on main lines by Trenitalia. Stops in big cities.

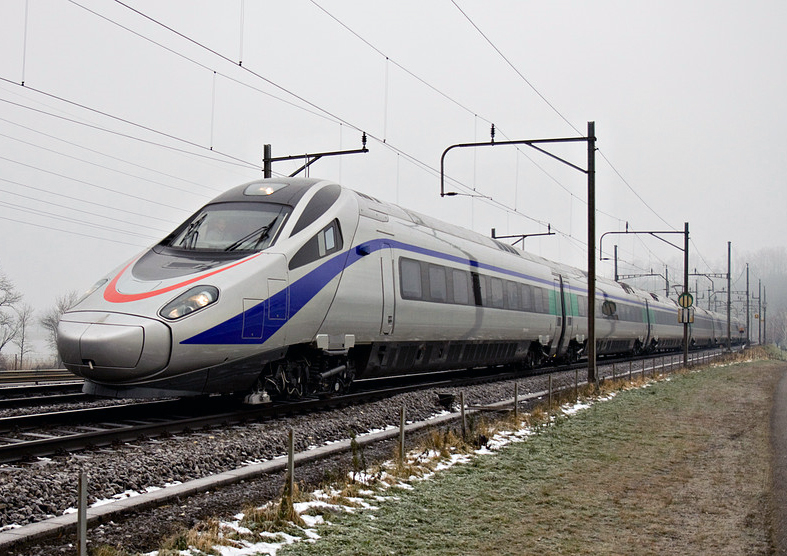
Eurocity, formerly Cisalpino, operates on international main lines within the European Union by Trenitalia. Stops in big cities.

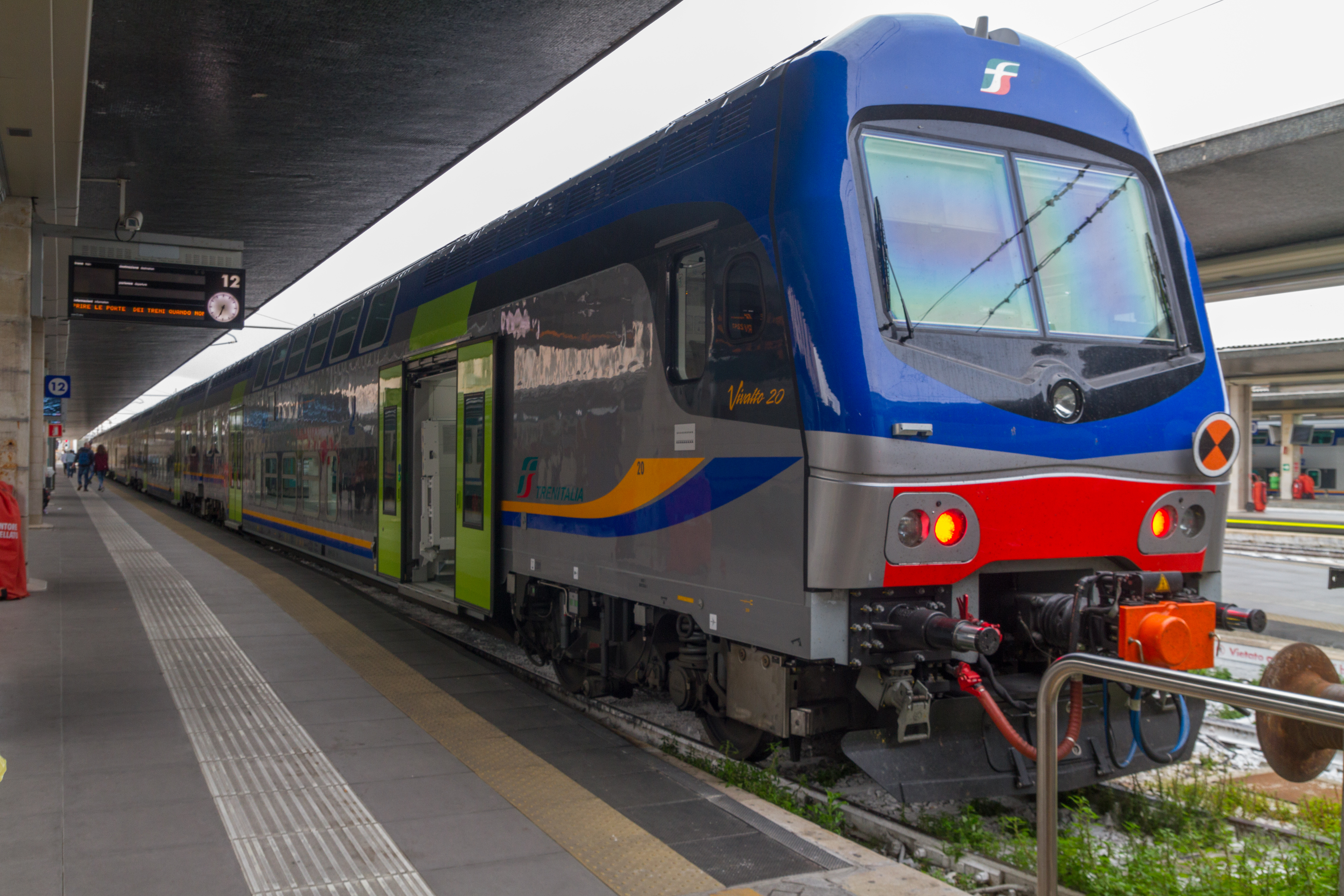
Regionale Veloce operates on regional lines in a region or in adjacent regions by Trenitalia. Stops in the main stations of the local service.

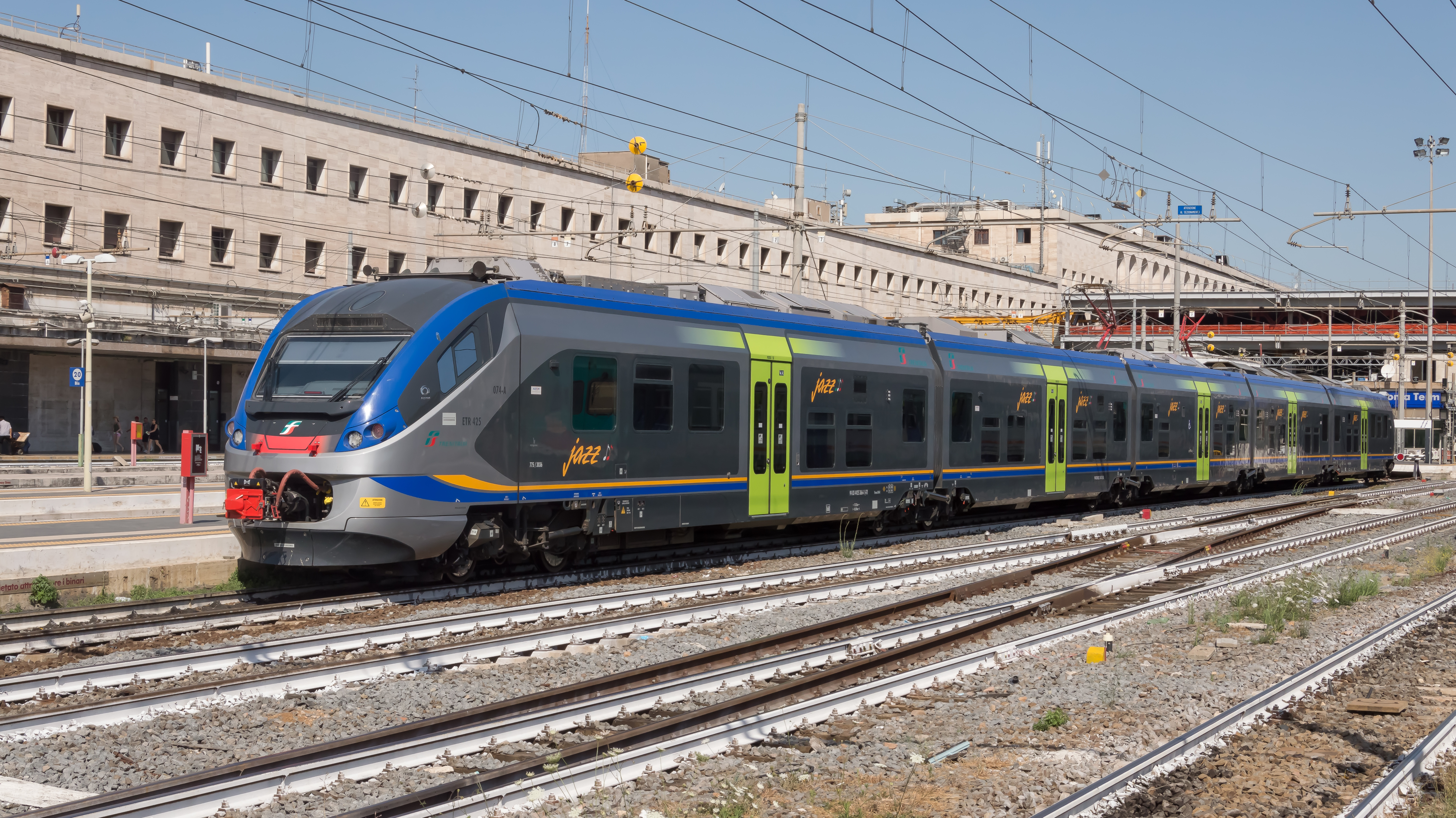
Regionale operates on regional lines by Trenitalia. Stops in every station of the local service.

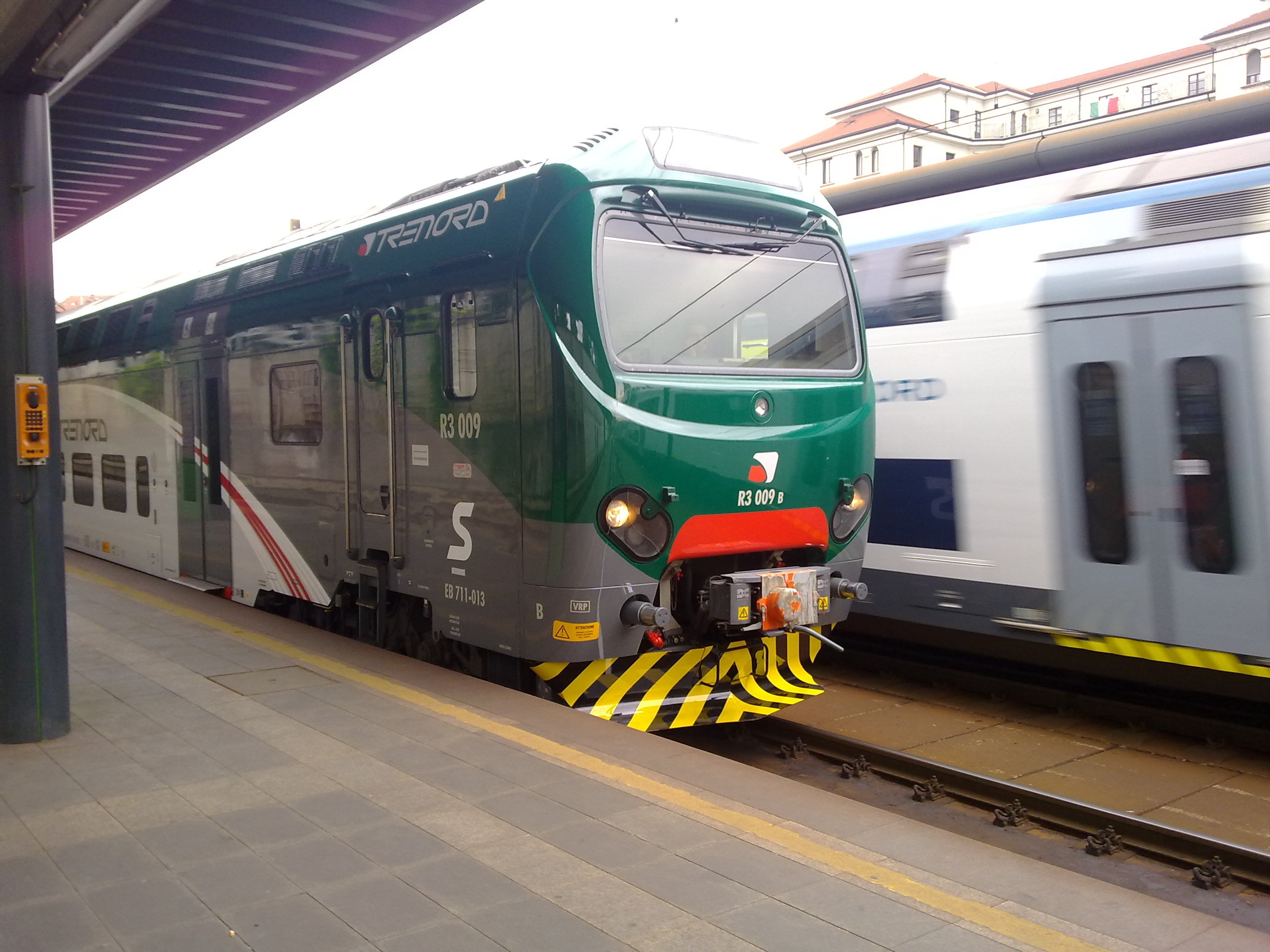
Regio-Express operates on regional lines by Trenord. Stops in some stations of the local service.

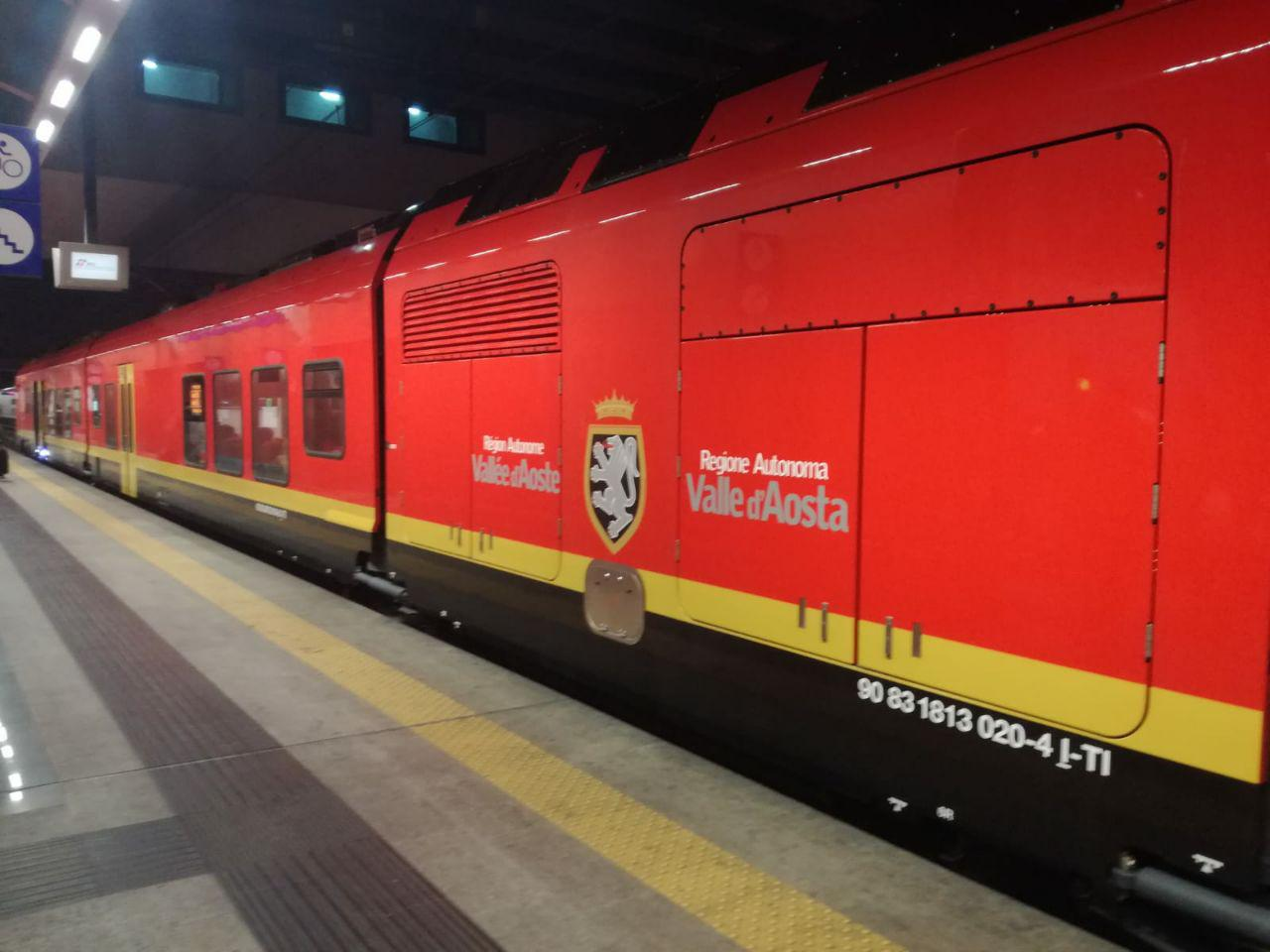
Regionale Veloce as operates in the Aosta Valley by Trenitalia

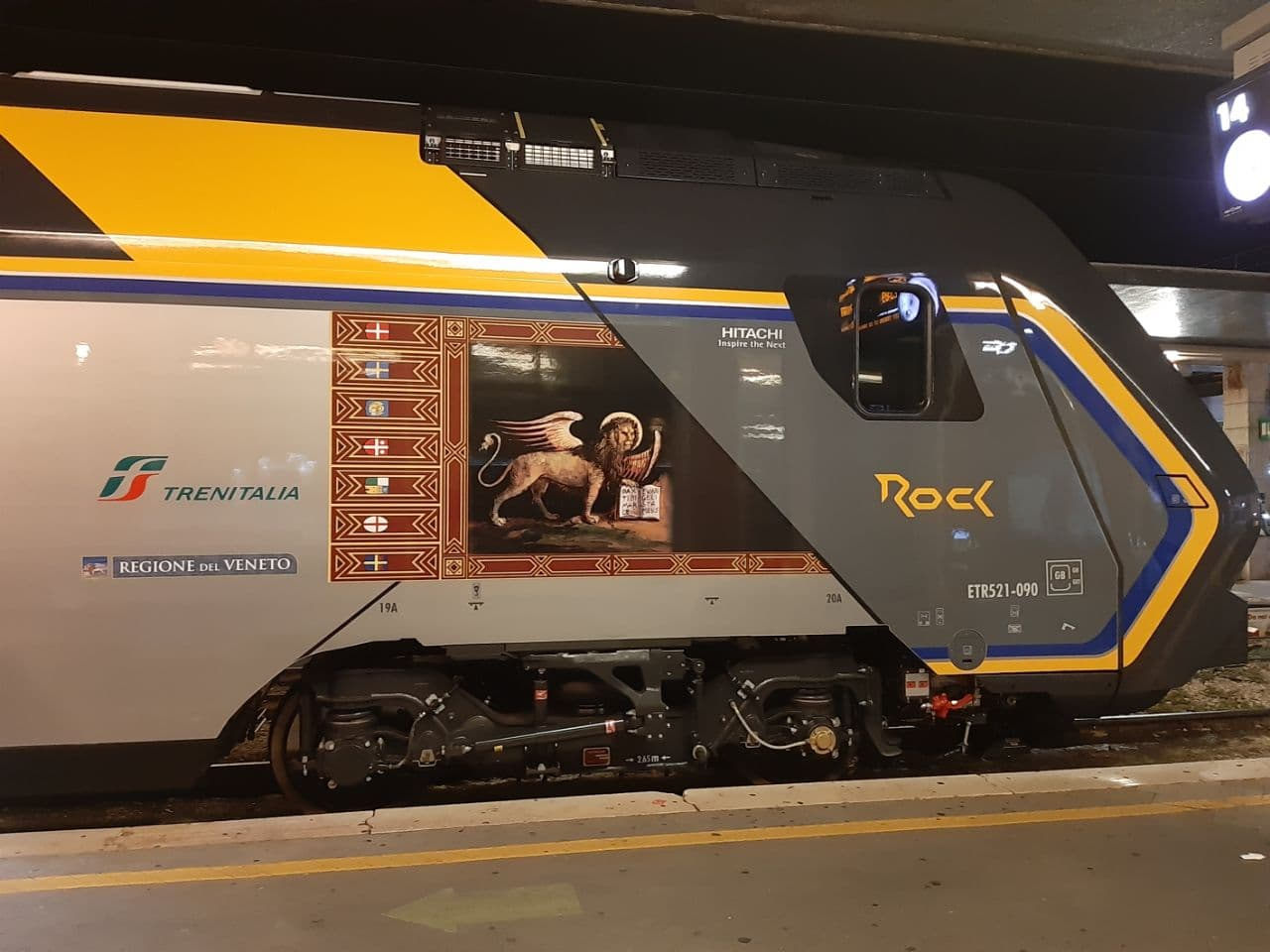
Regionale Veloce as operates in Veneto by Trenitalia

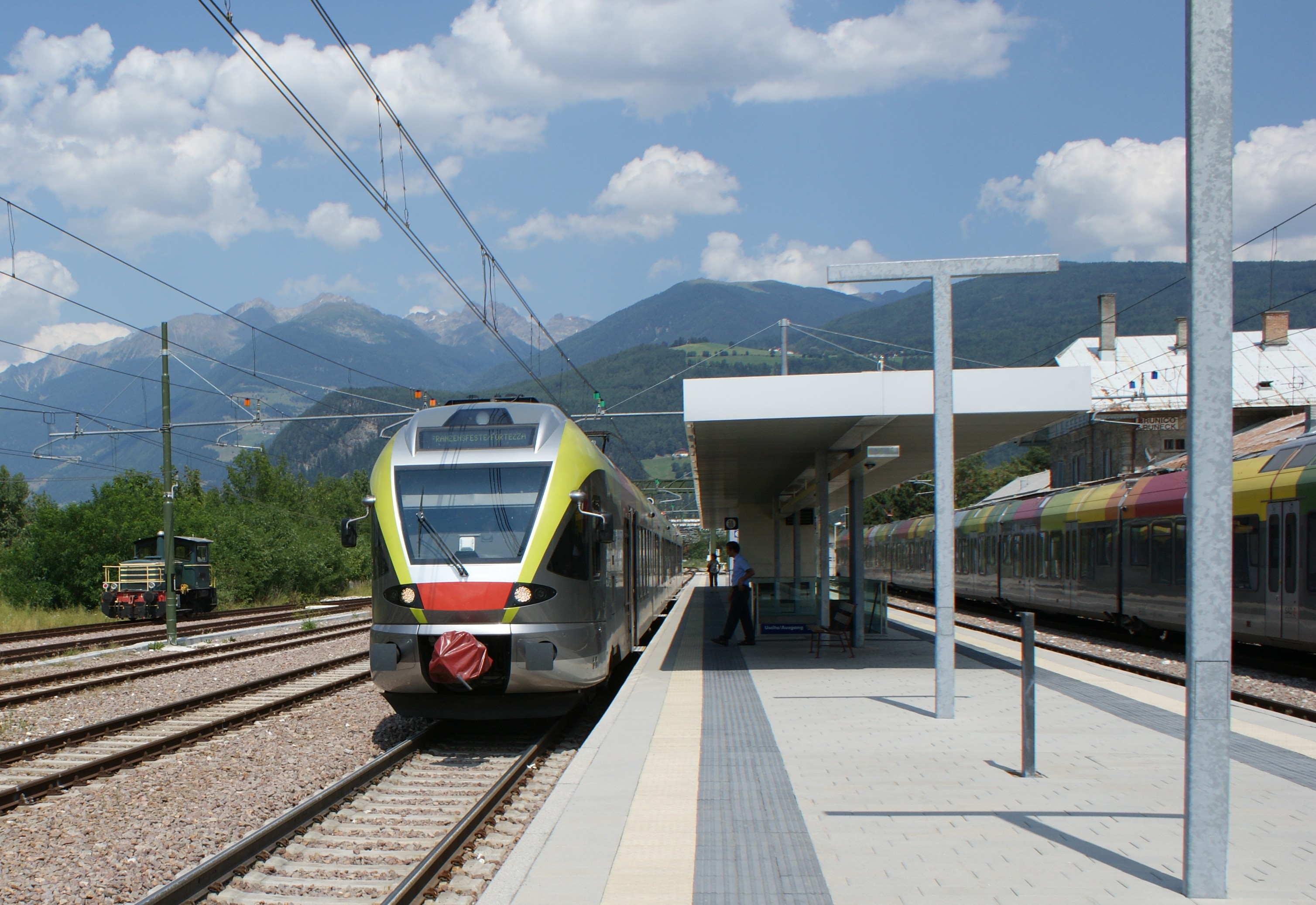
Regionale as operates in Trentino-Alto Adige by SAD

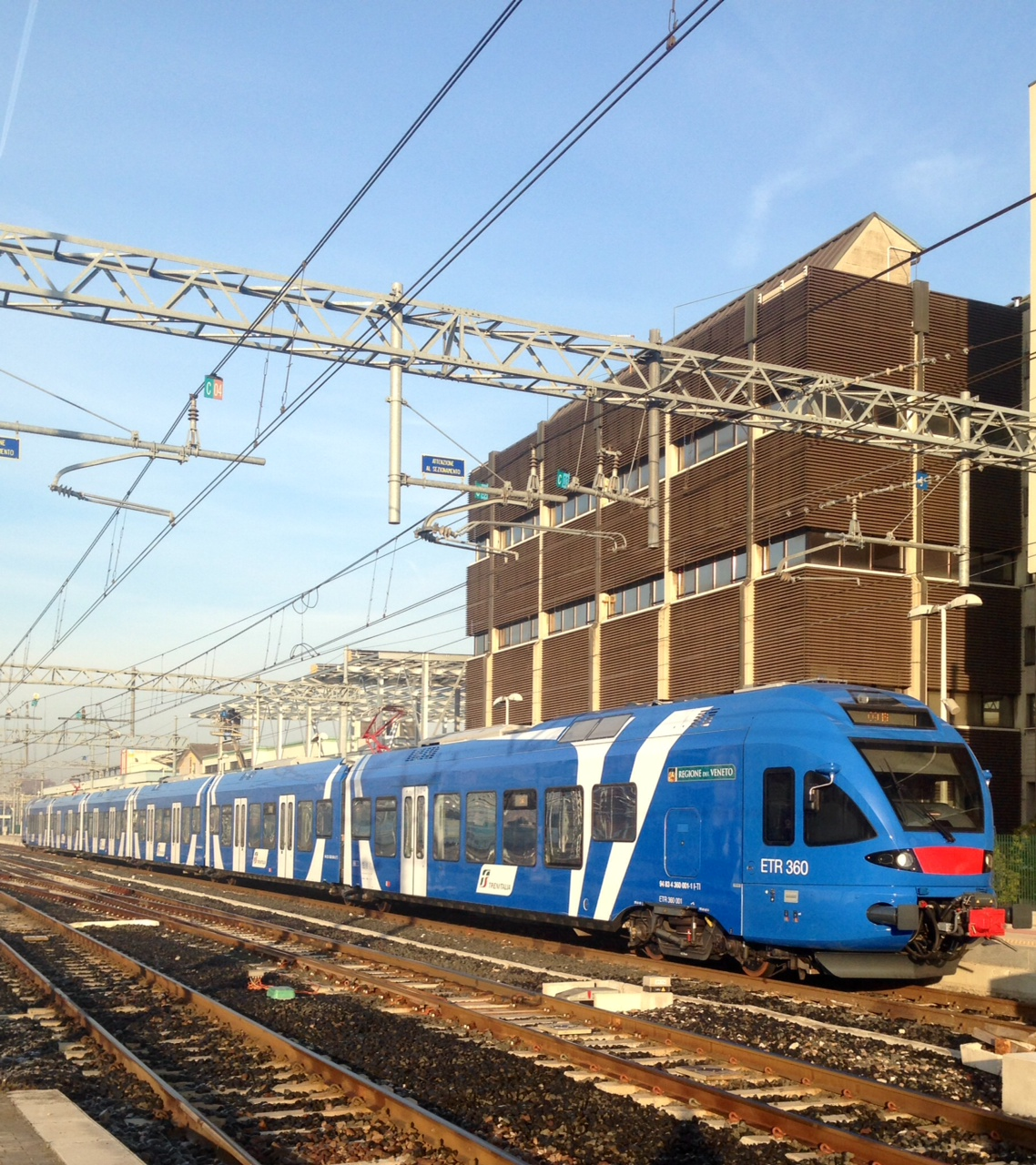
Regionale as operates in some lines of Veneto by Sistemi Territoriali (ST)

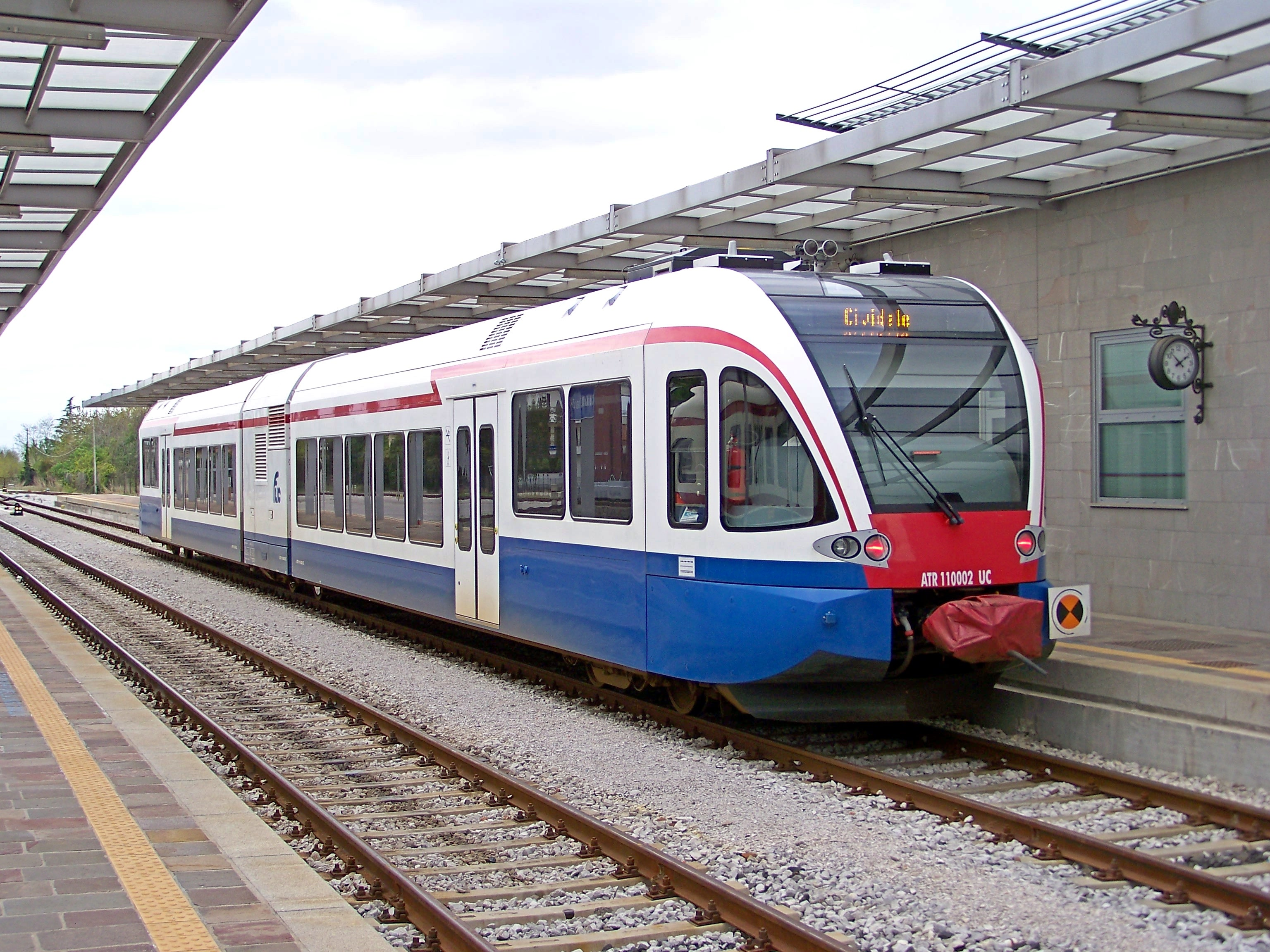
Regionale as operates in Friuli-Venezia Giulia by Società Ferrovie Udine-Cividale (FUC)

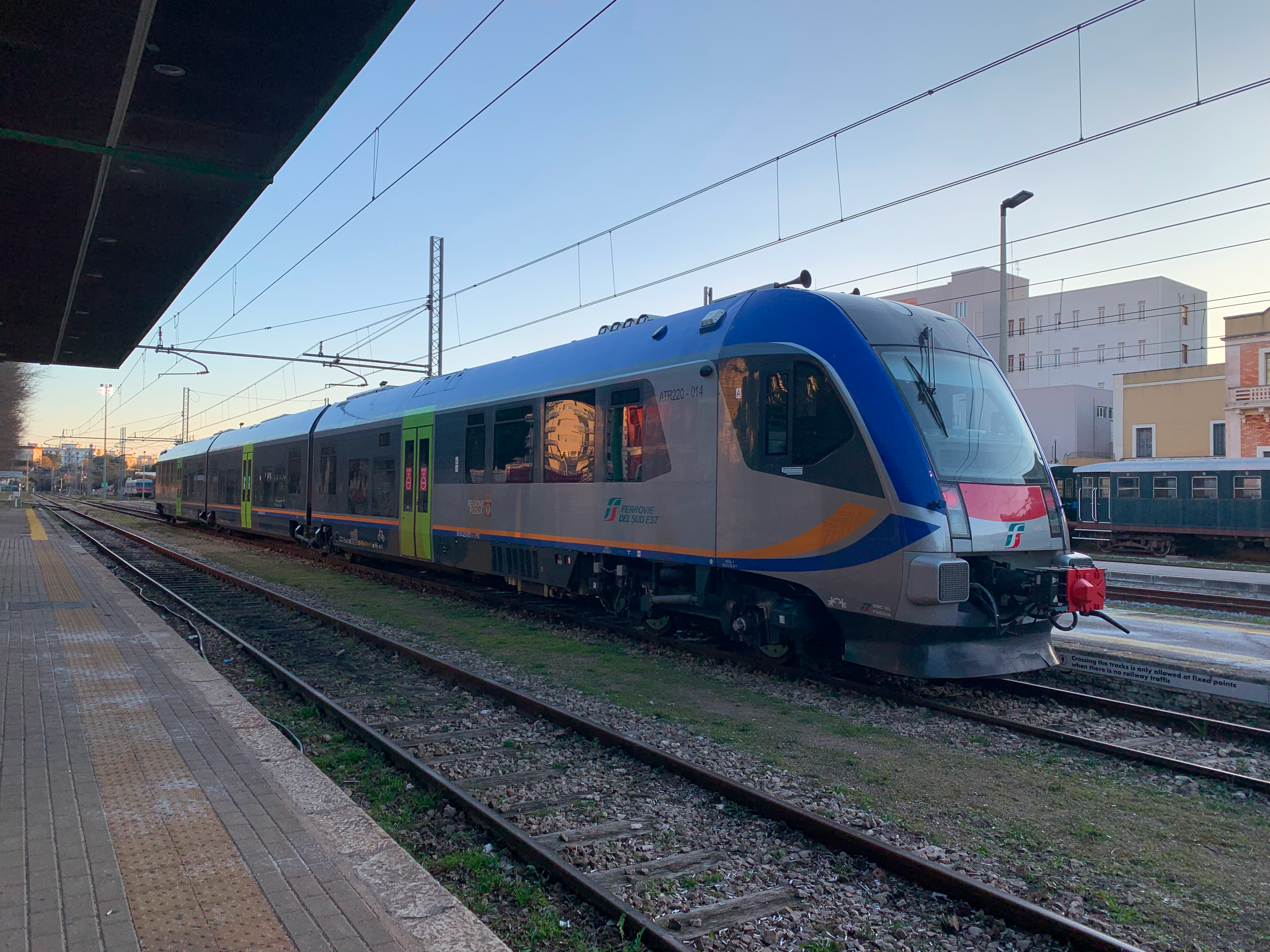
Regionale as operates in Apulia by Ferrovie del Sud Est (FSE)

== Main stations ==
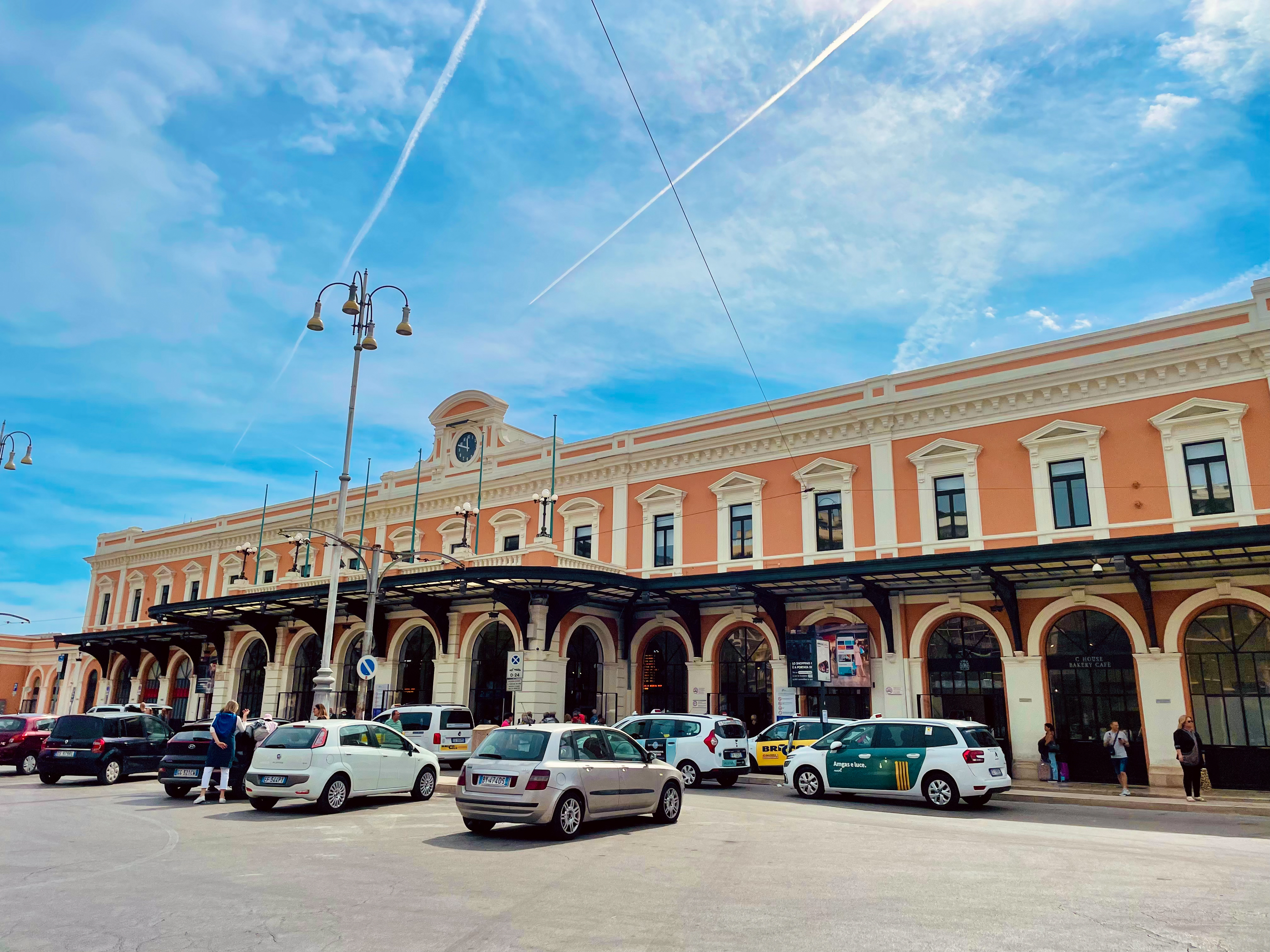
Bari Centrale, Bari

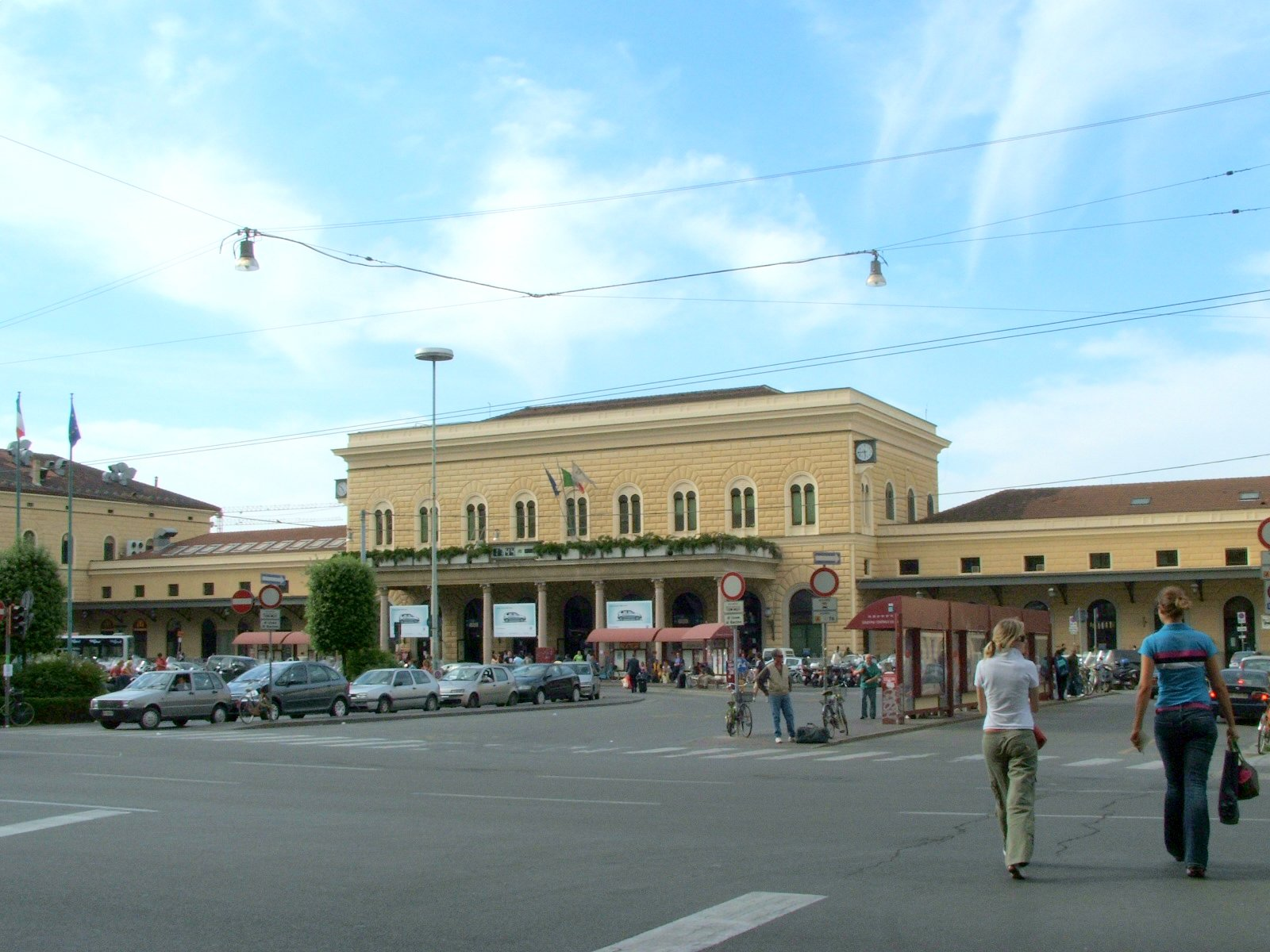
Bologna Centrale, Bologna

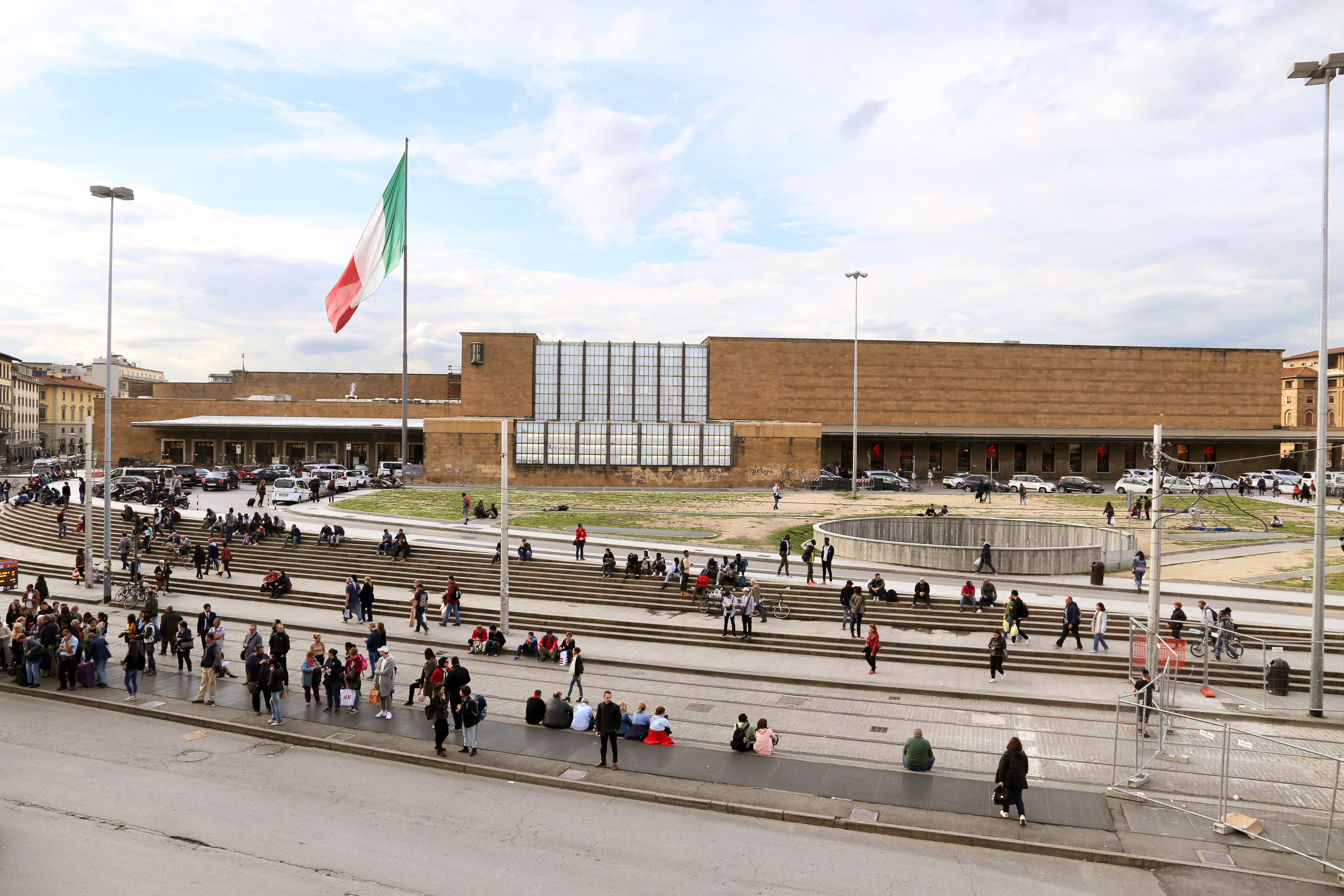
Firenze Santa Maria Novella, Florence

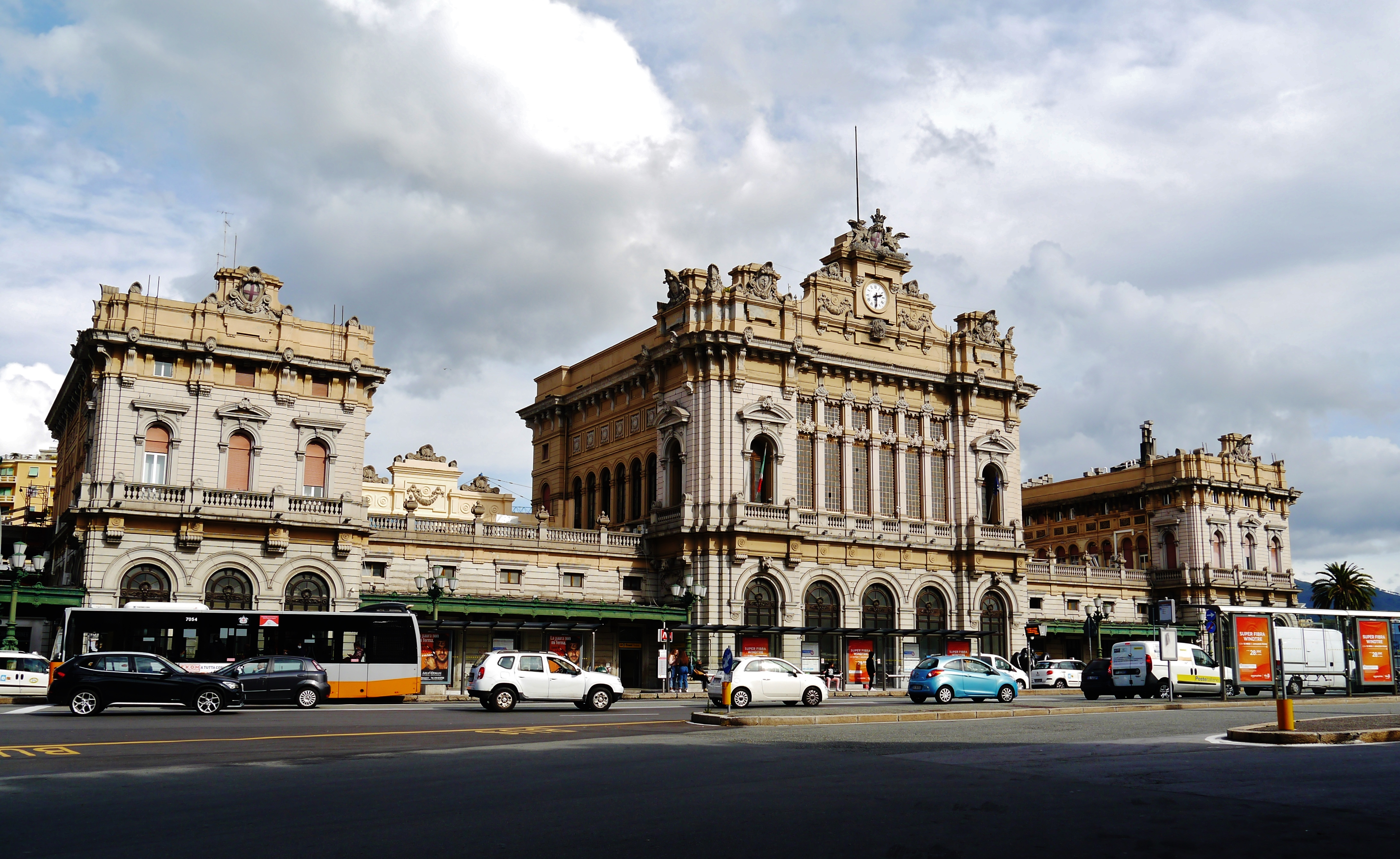
Genova Brignole, Genoa

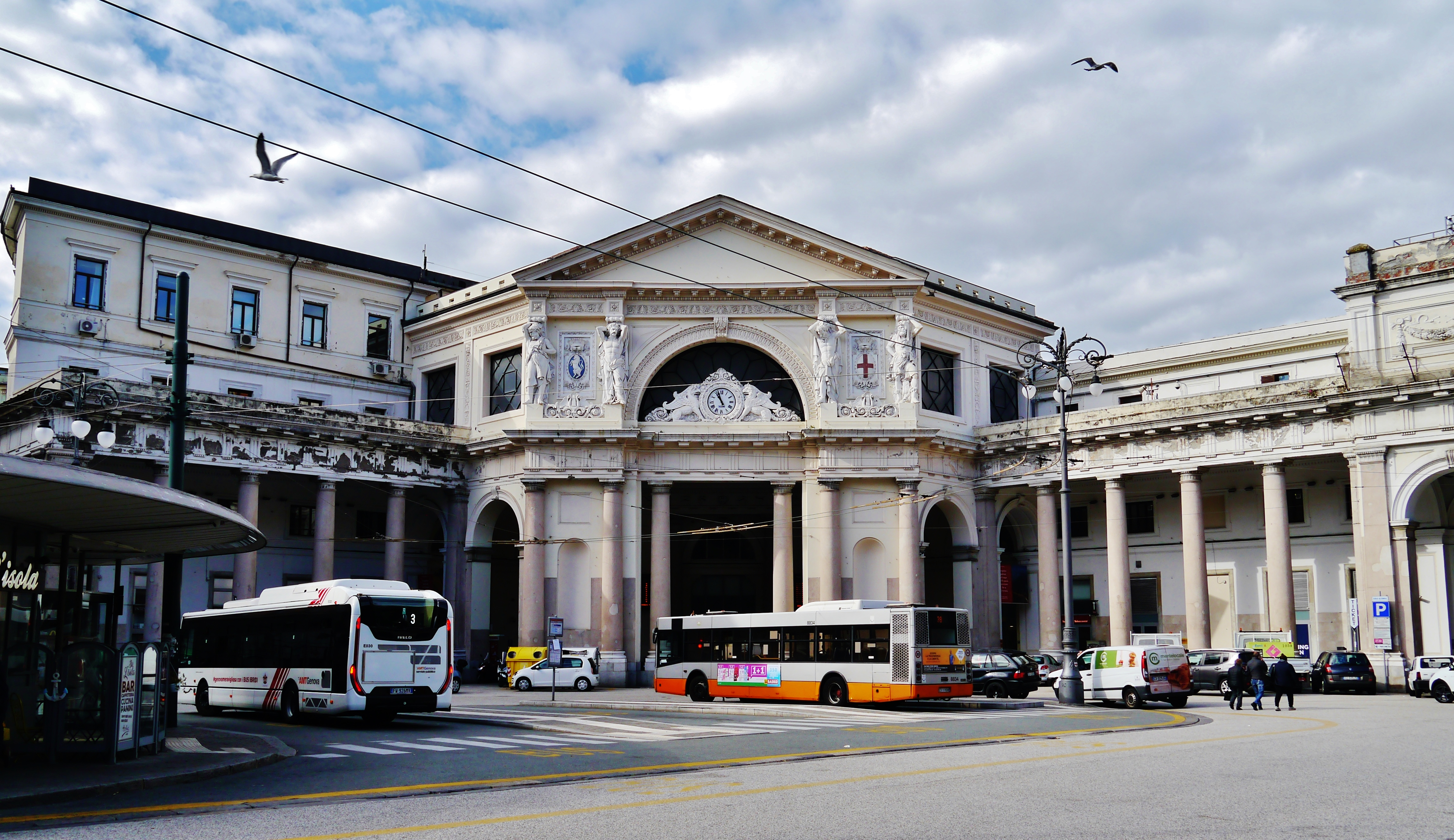
Genova Piazza Principe, Genoa

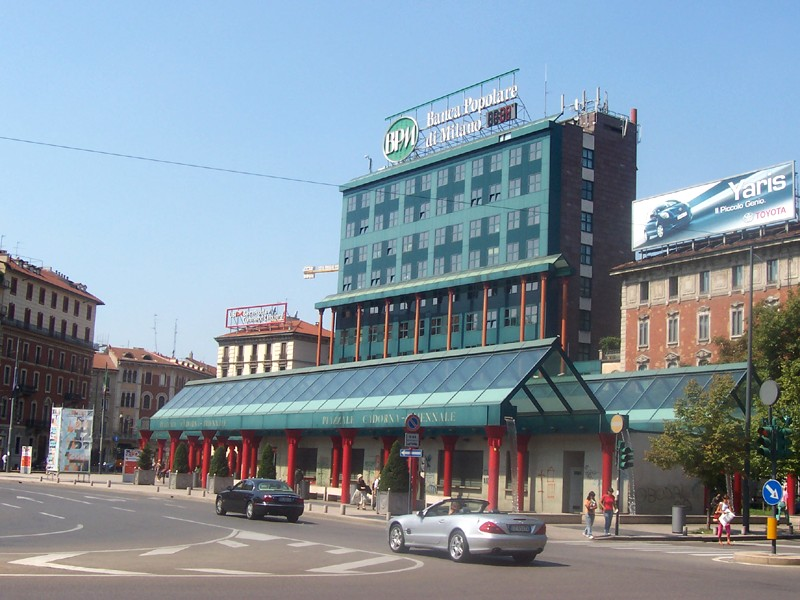
Milano Cadorna, Milan

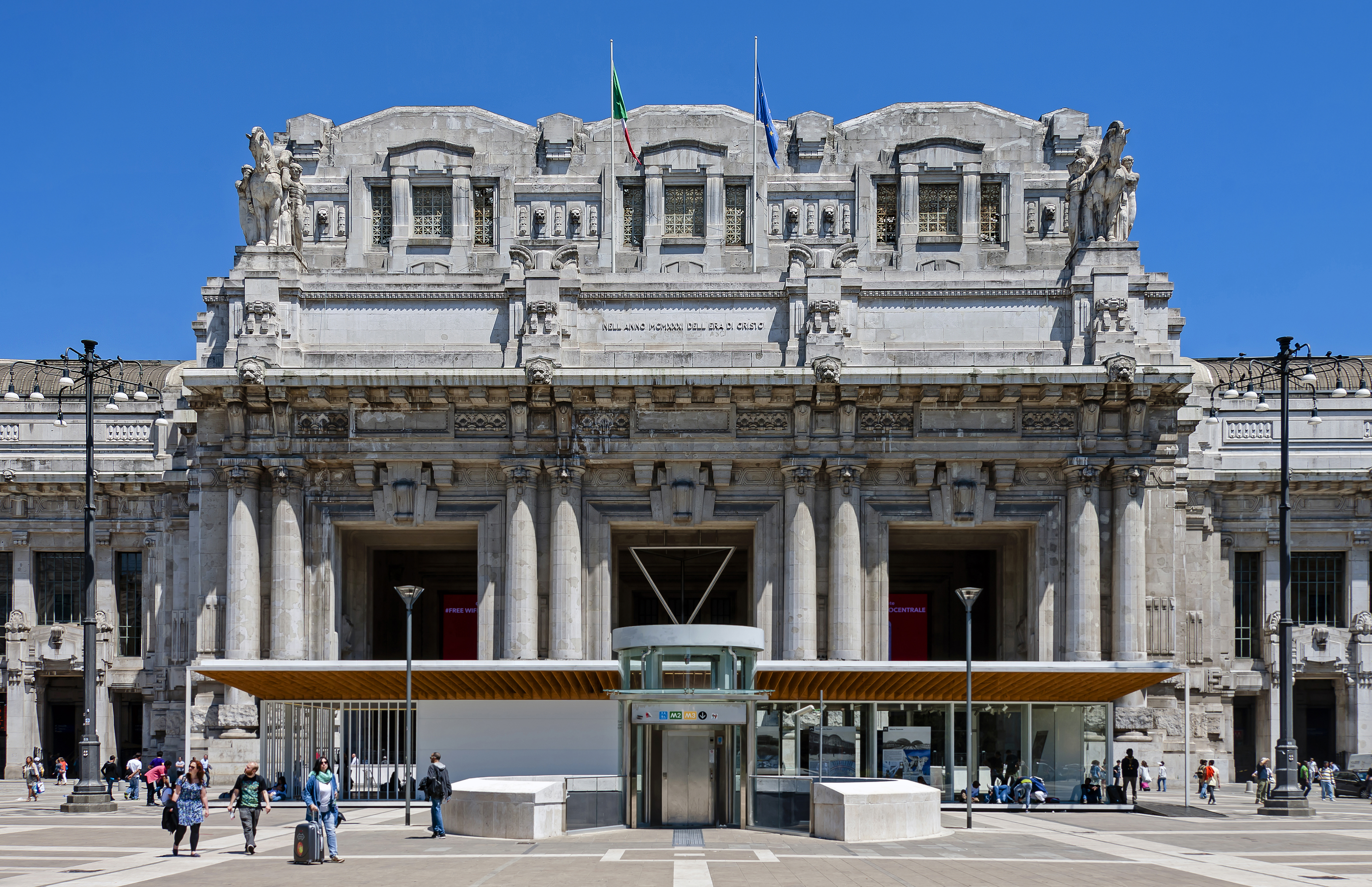
Milano Centrale, Milan

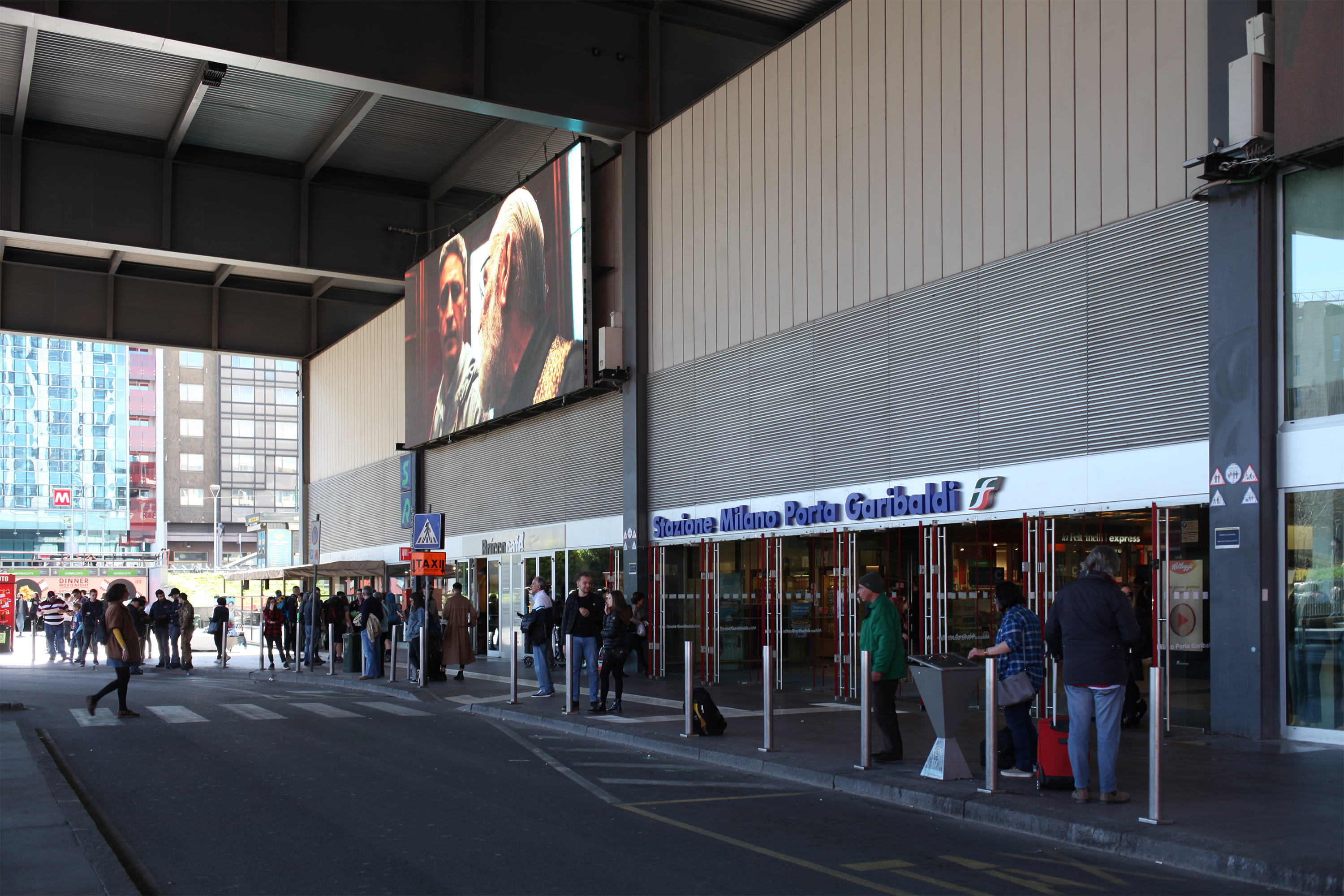
Milano Porta Garibaldi, Milan

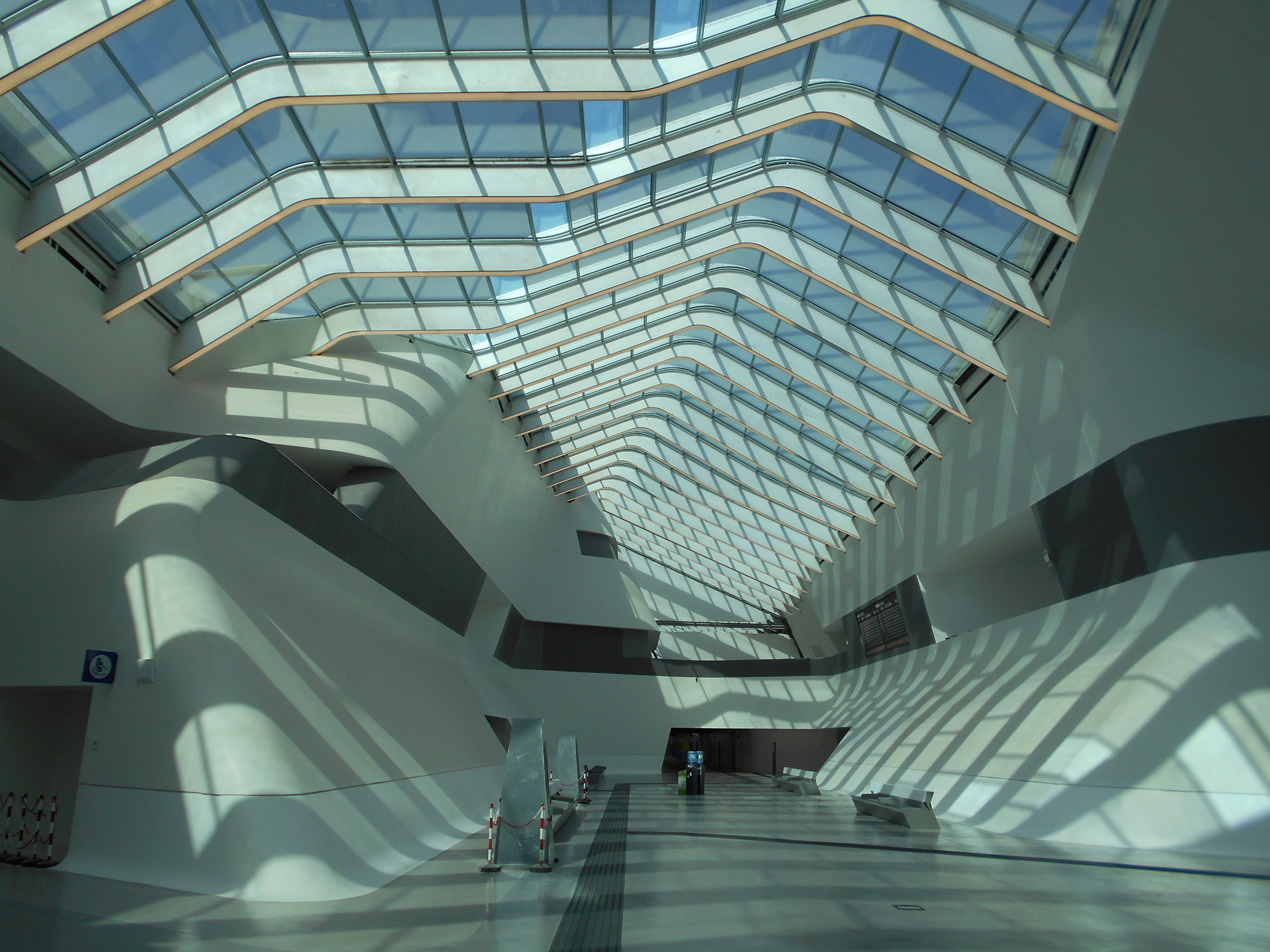
Napoli Afragola, Metropolitan City of Naples

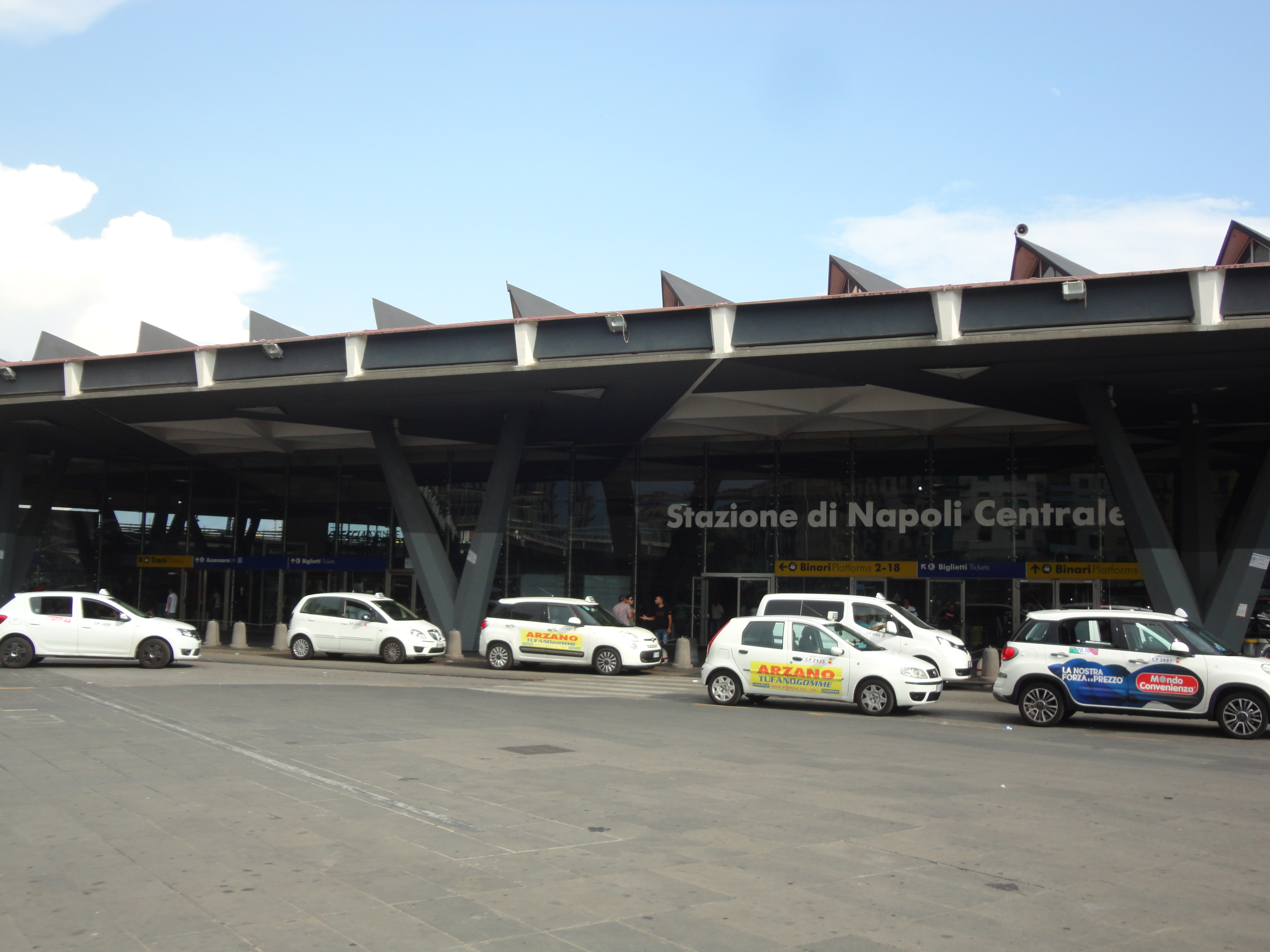
Napoli Centrale, Naples

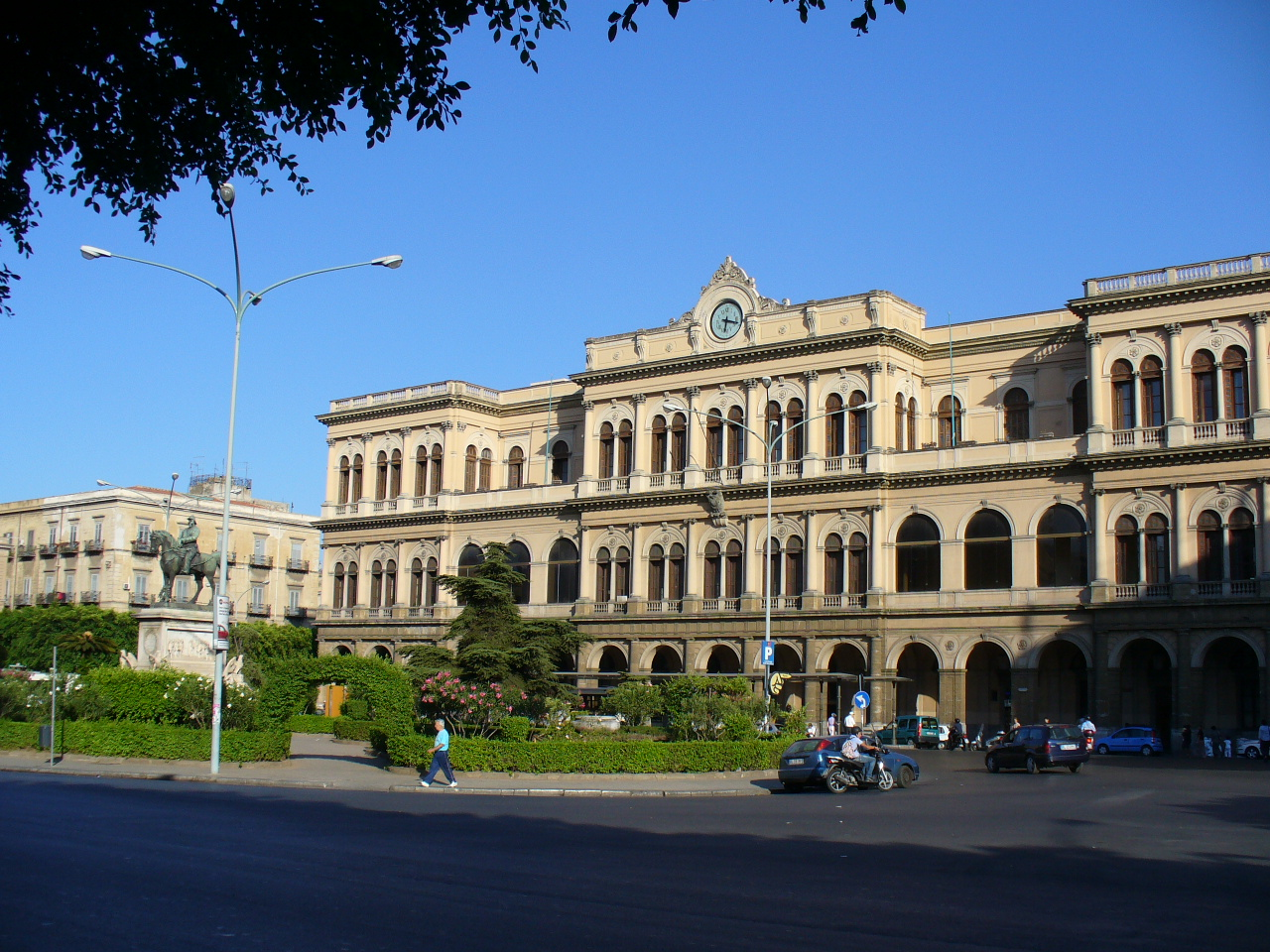
Palermo Centrale, Palermo

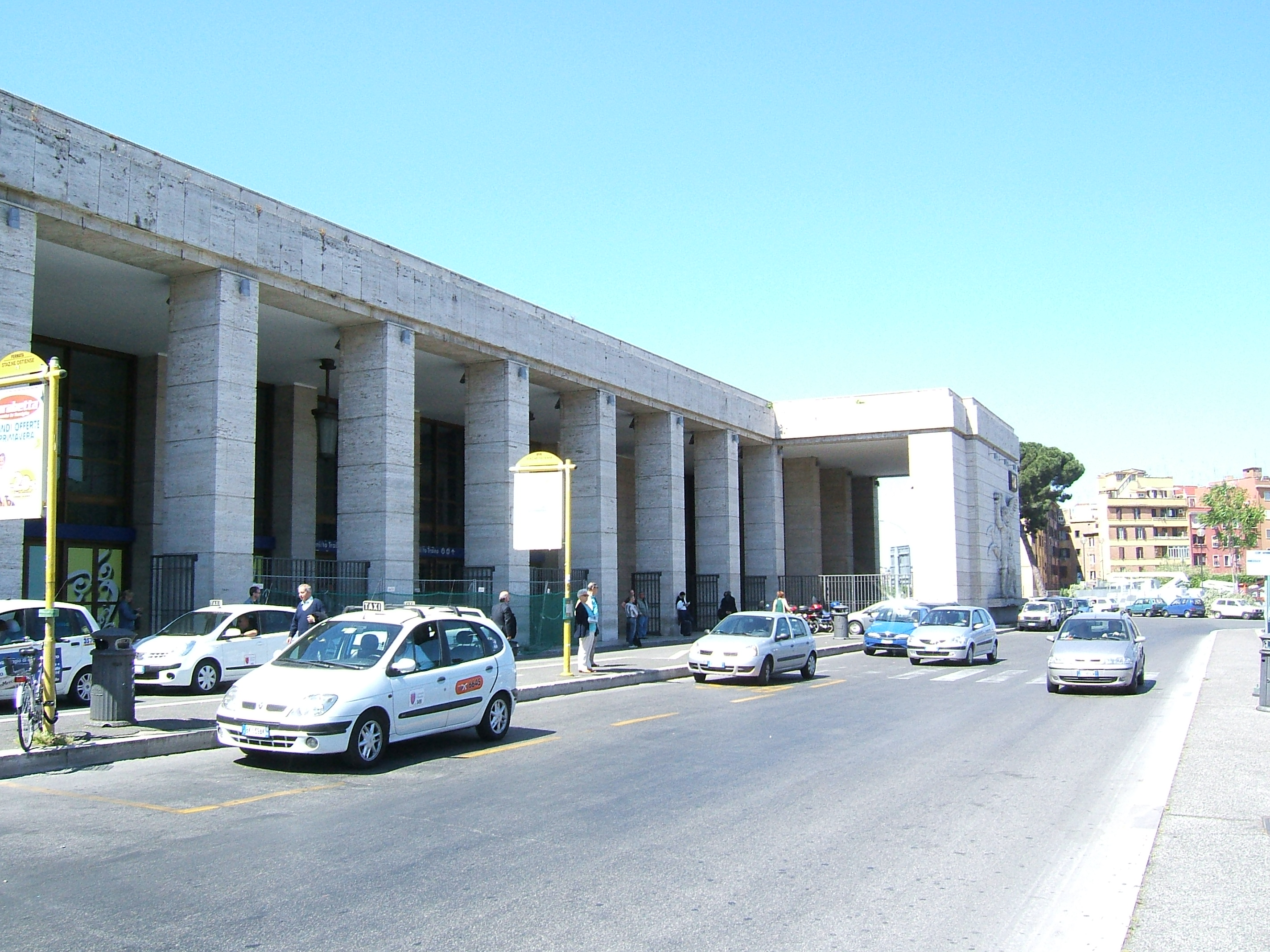
Roma Ostiense, Rome

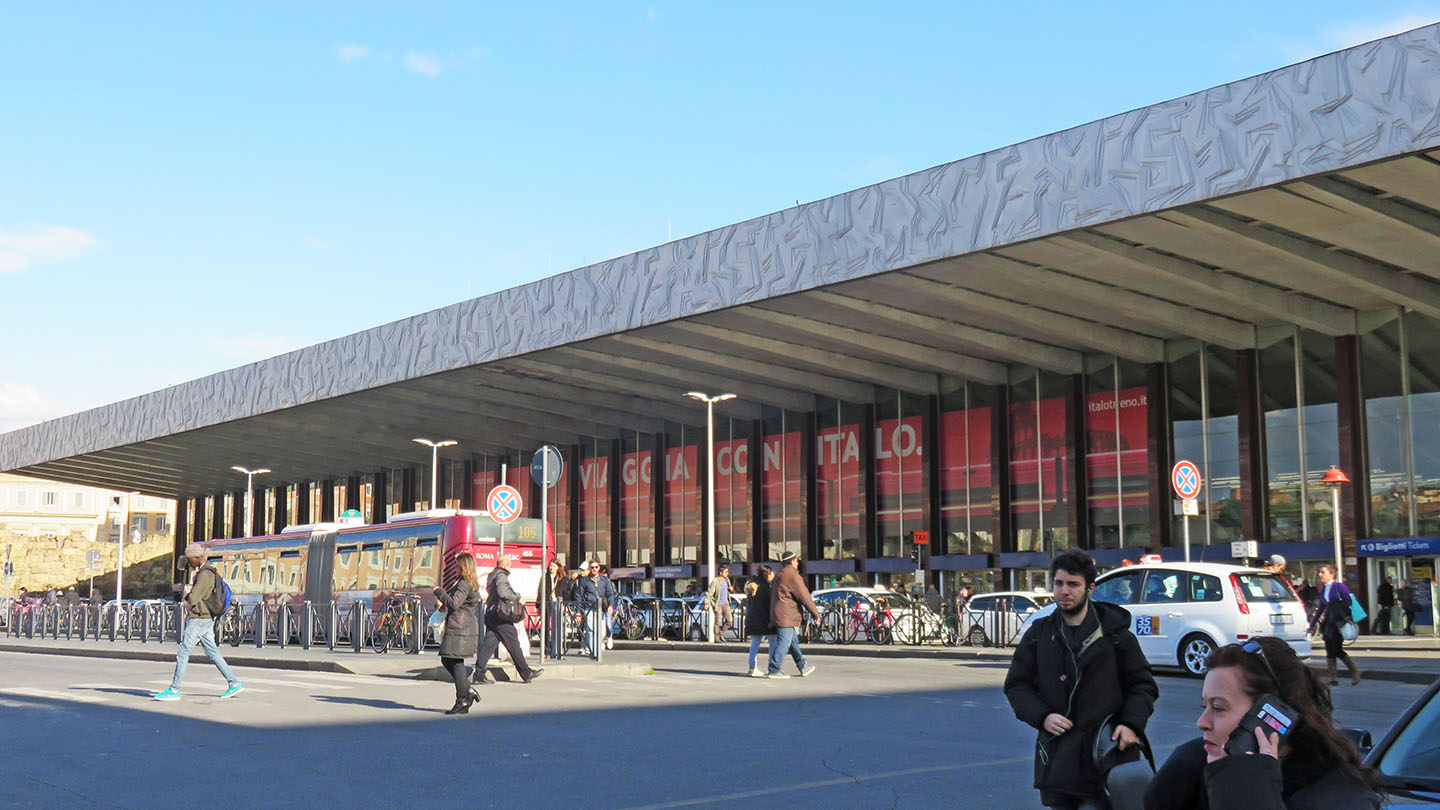
Roma Termini, Rome

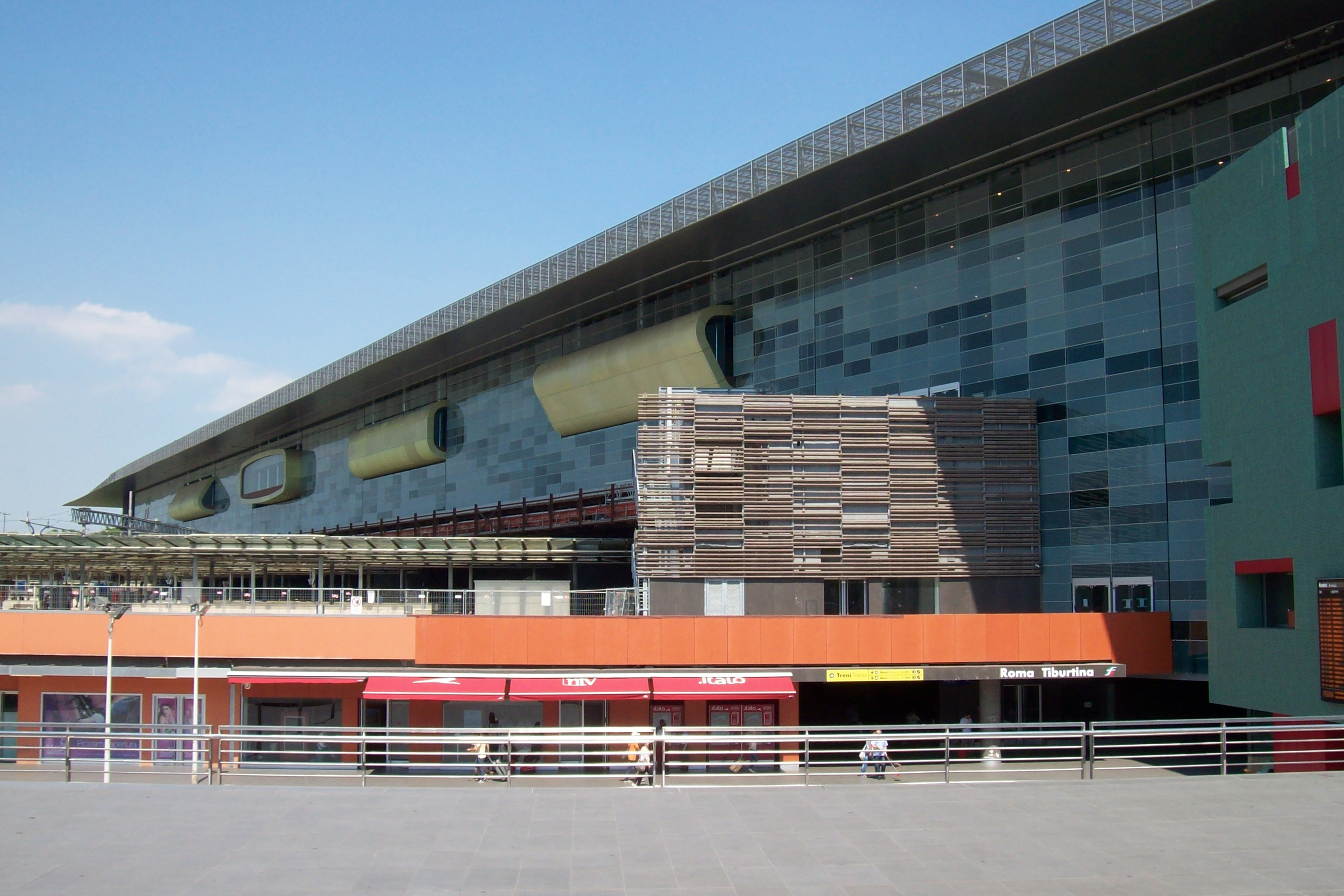
Roma Tiburtina, Rome

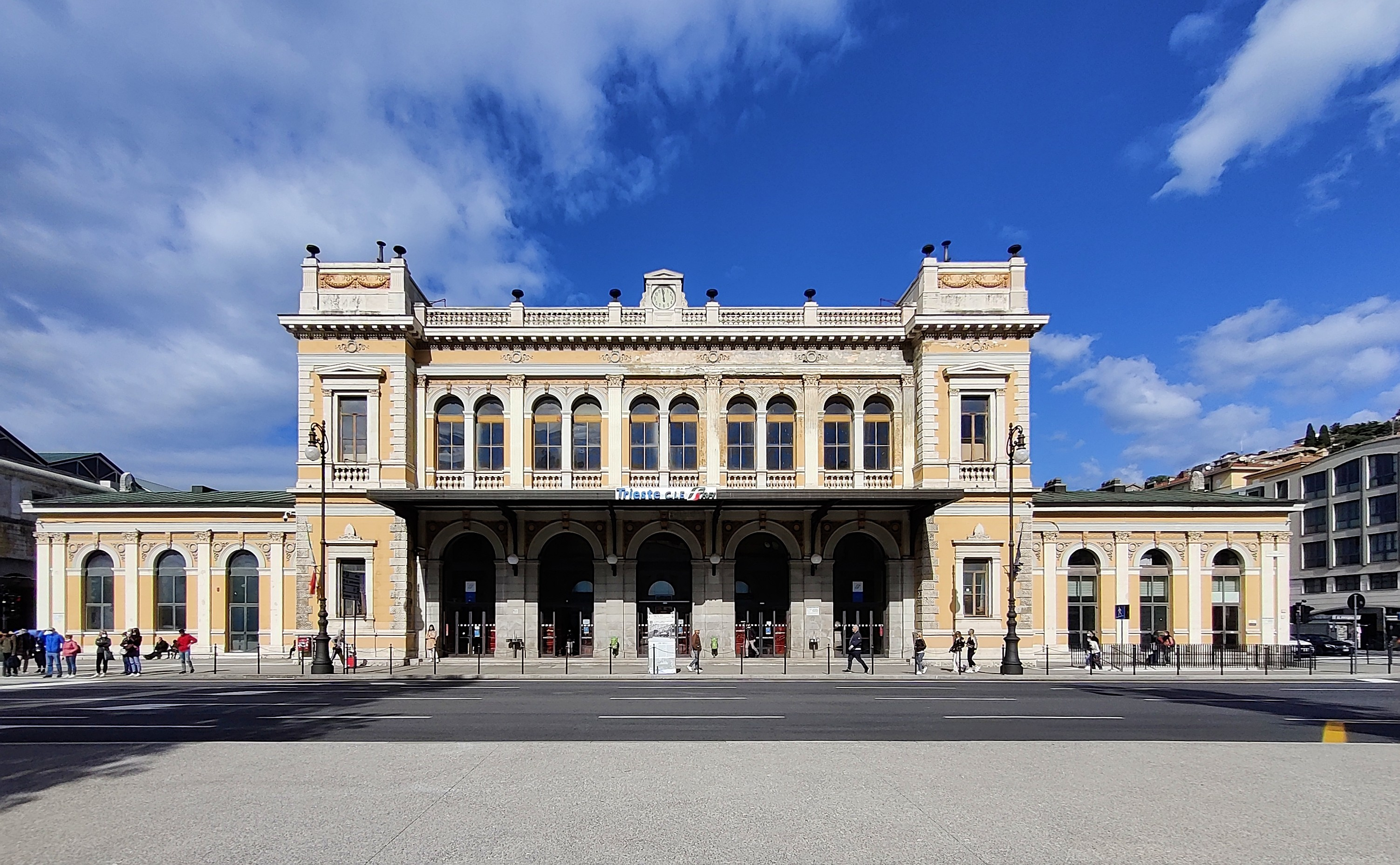
Trieste Centrale, Trieste

Torino Porta Nuova, Turin

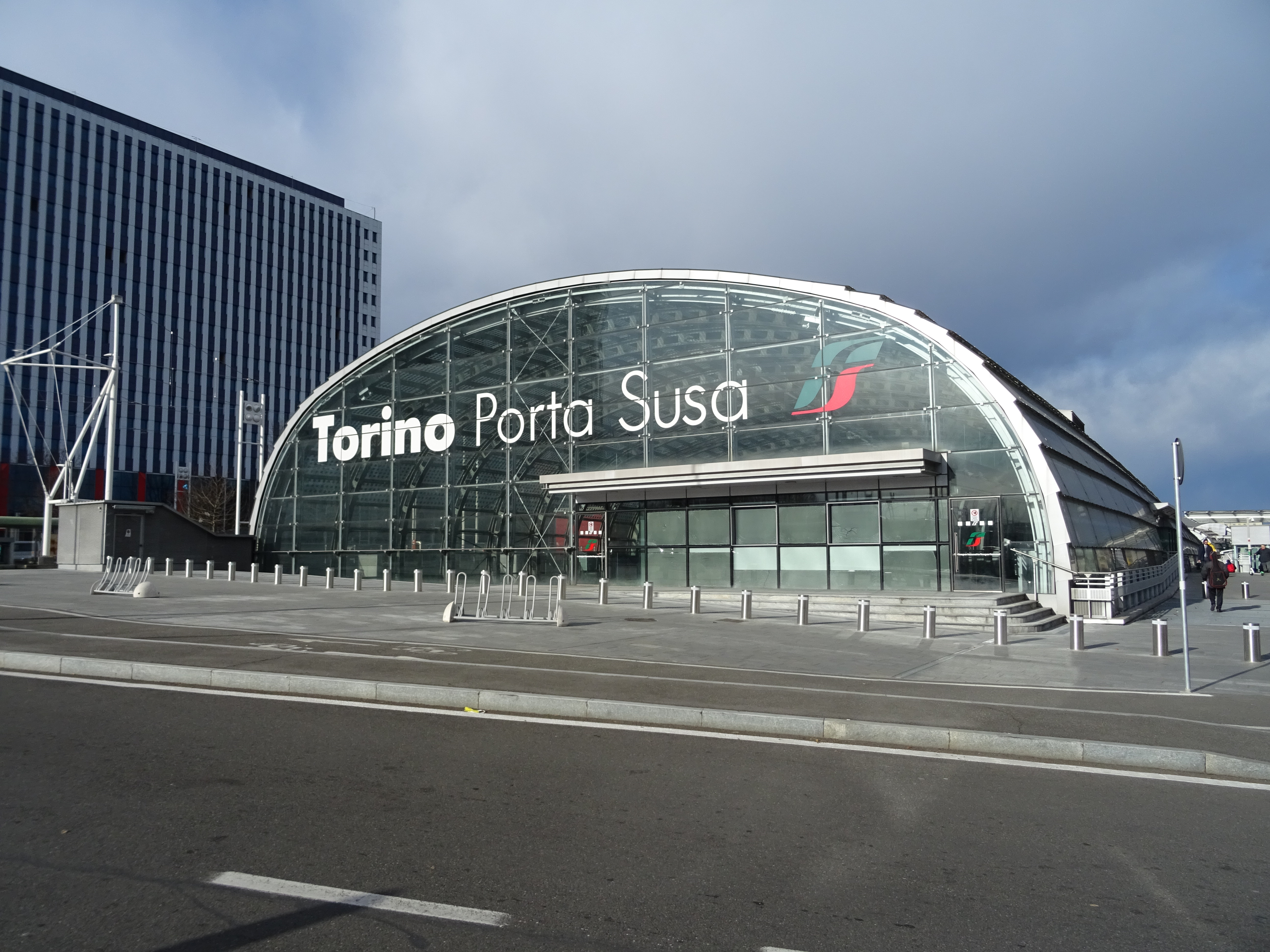
Torino Porta Susa, Turin

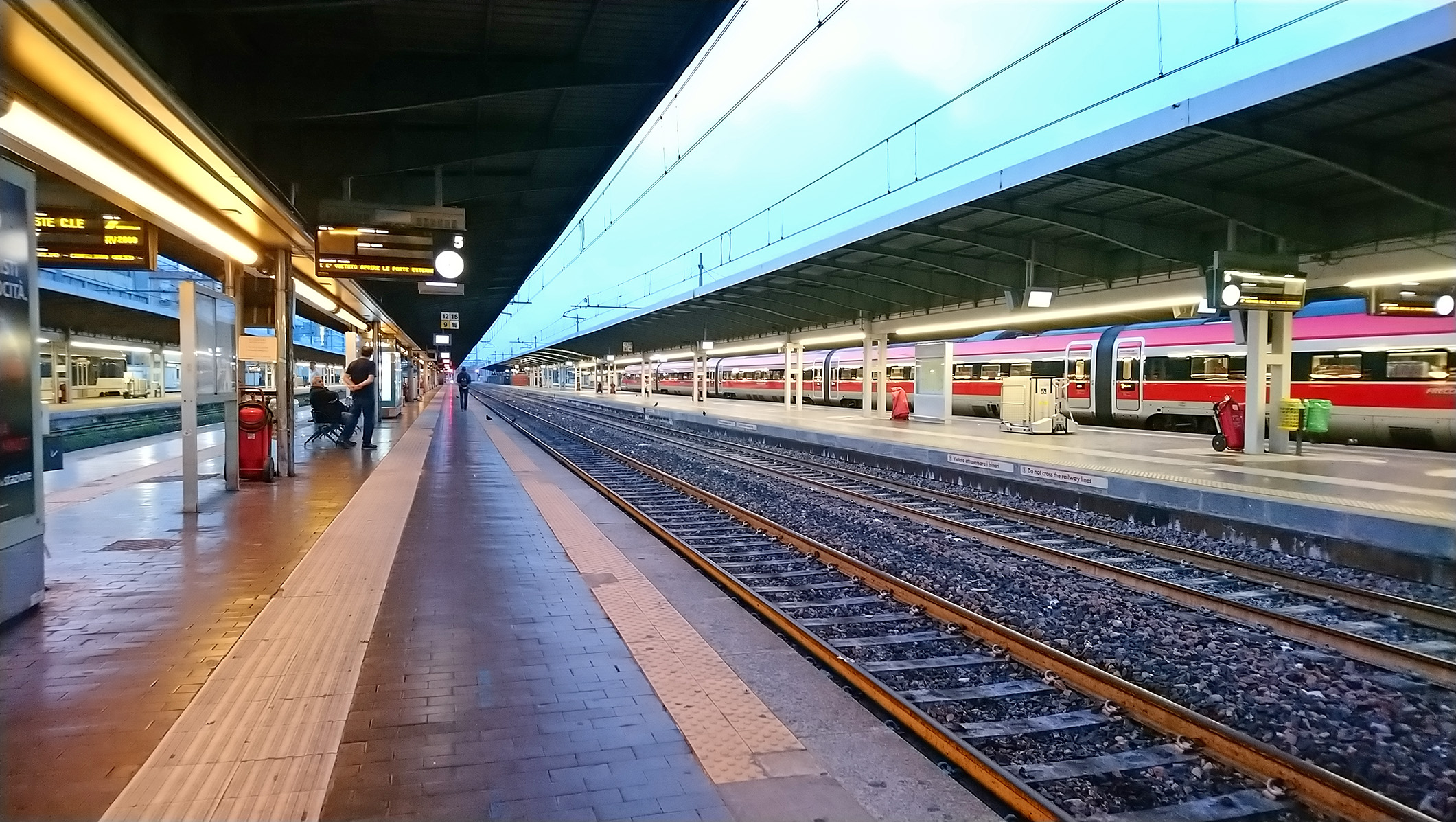
Venezia Mestre, Venice

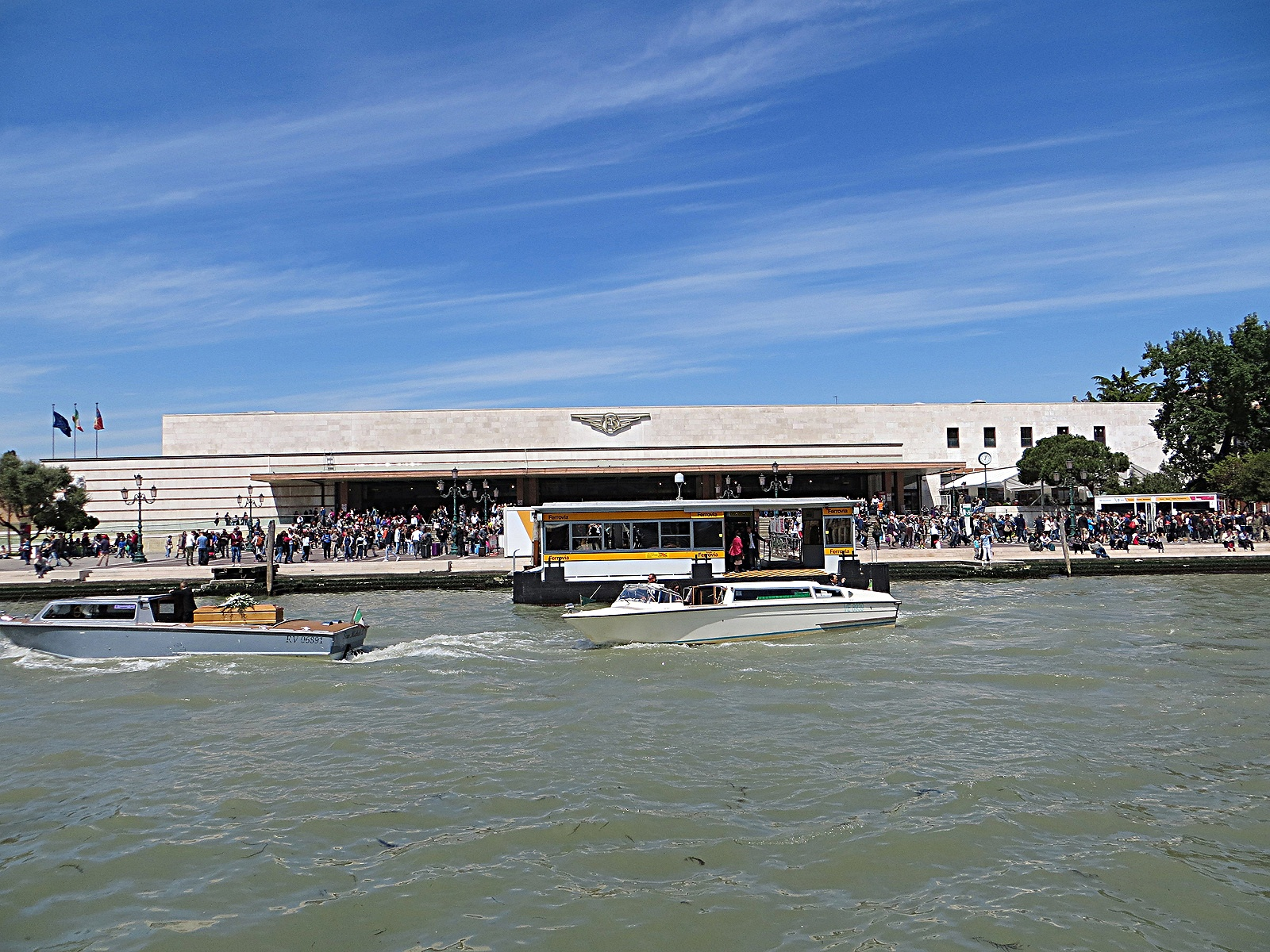
Venezia Santa Lucia, Venice

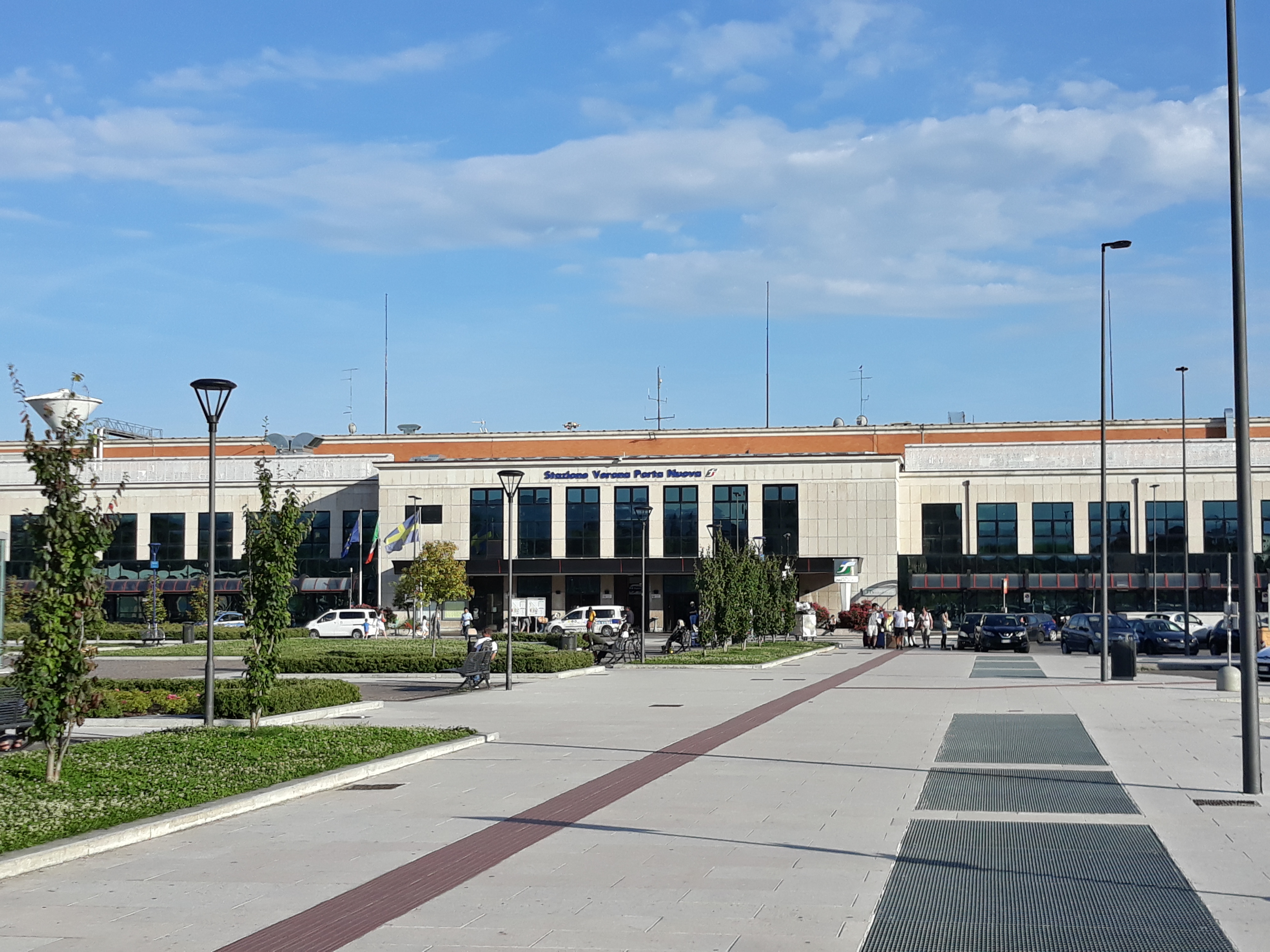
Verona Porta Nuova, Verona

== See also ==
- Ferrovie dello Stato Italiane
- History of rail transport in Italy
- Railway stations in Italy
- Transport in Italy
- Trenitalia
- Treno Alta Velocità
- Rail transport in Europe

== Bibliography ==
- Parks, Tim (2013). Italian Ways: On and Off the Rails from Milan to Palermo. London: Harvill Secker. ISBN 9781846557743.
- Fascicolo Linea 82 bis – AV/AC Torino – Milano – Napoli Tratto di linea Milano Rogoredo – Firenze Castello e relative interconnessioni con linea Milano – Bologna – Firenze (Tradizionale) (in Italian). Rete Ferroviaria Italiana. pp. 90–119 and 150–179.
