= Le Frecce =

High-speed trains in Italy

Overview
- Owner: Trenitalia
- Locale: Italy
- Transit type: High speed train

Operation
- Rolling stock: Frecciarossa: ETR 500, ETR 1000, ETR 600, ETR 700; Frecciargento: ETR 485, ETR 600/610, ETR 700; Frecciabianca: ETR 460/463, ETR 470

Technical
- Top speed: 300 km/h (186 mph) (Frecciarossa); 250 km/h (155 mph) (Frecciargento); 200 km/h (124 mph) (Frecciabianca)

Le Frecce is the high-speed rail train category operated by Trenitalia in Italy under overall three brand names.

== History ==
In 1997, a new category, "Eurostar", was introduced as the brand name of the high-speed trains run by Trenitalia in Italy. Since 2006, trains started to be operated and promoted under further sub-brands and less and less sold under the name "Eurostar".

In June 2012, the category Eurostar was officially divided into various subcategories indicating various high-speed services. The new categories created were Frecciarossa (Red Arrow) for the fastest trains, Frecciargento (Silver Arrow) for the next category of trains and finally Frecciabianca (White Arrow). Since all these three train categories are named as "Freccia" (Arrow), the high-speed trains operated by Trenitalia are named "Le Frecce", on a par with TGV in France, ICE in Germany and AVE in Spain.

== Categories ==
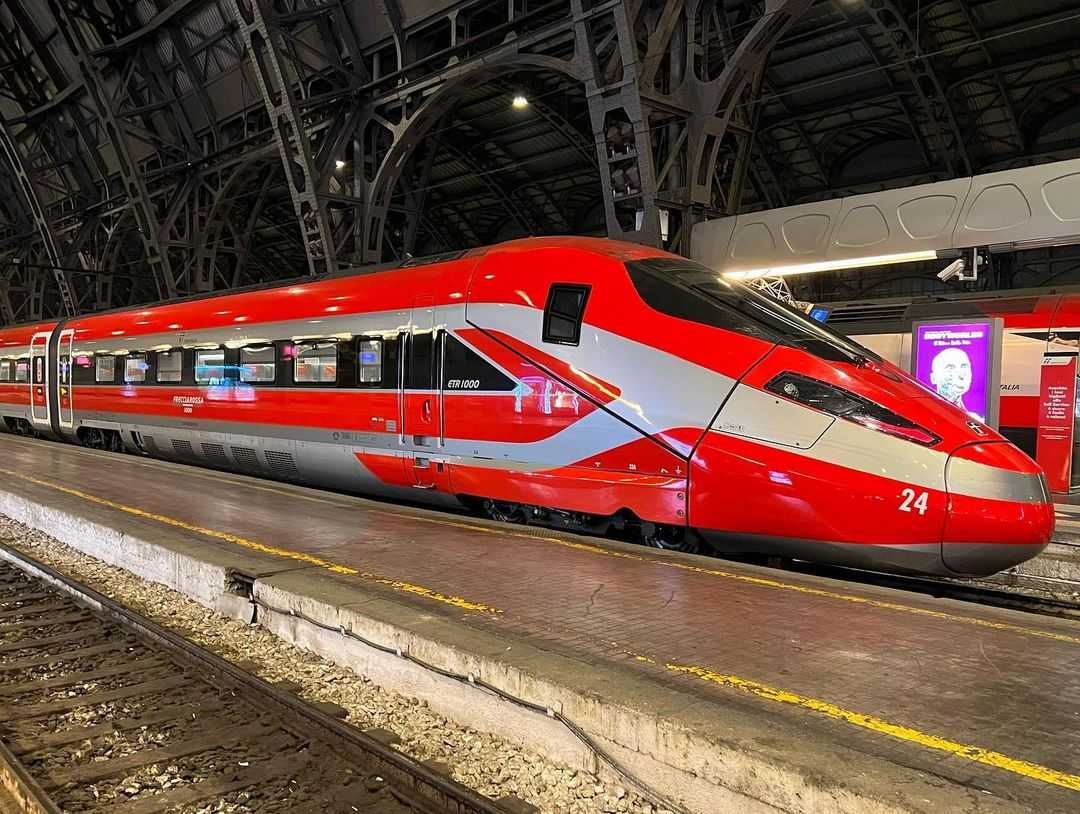
FS ETR 1000 as Frecciarossa

FS ETR 600 as Frecciargento

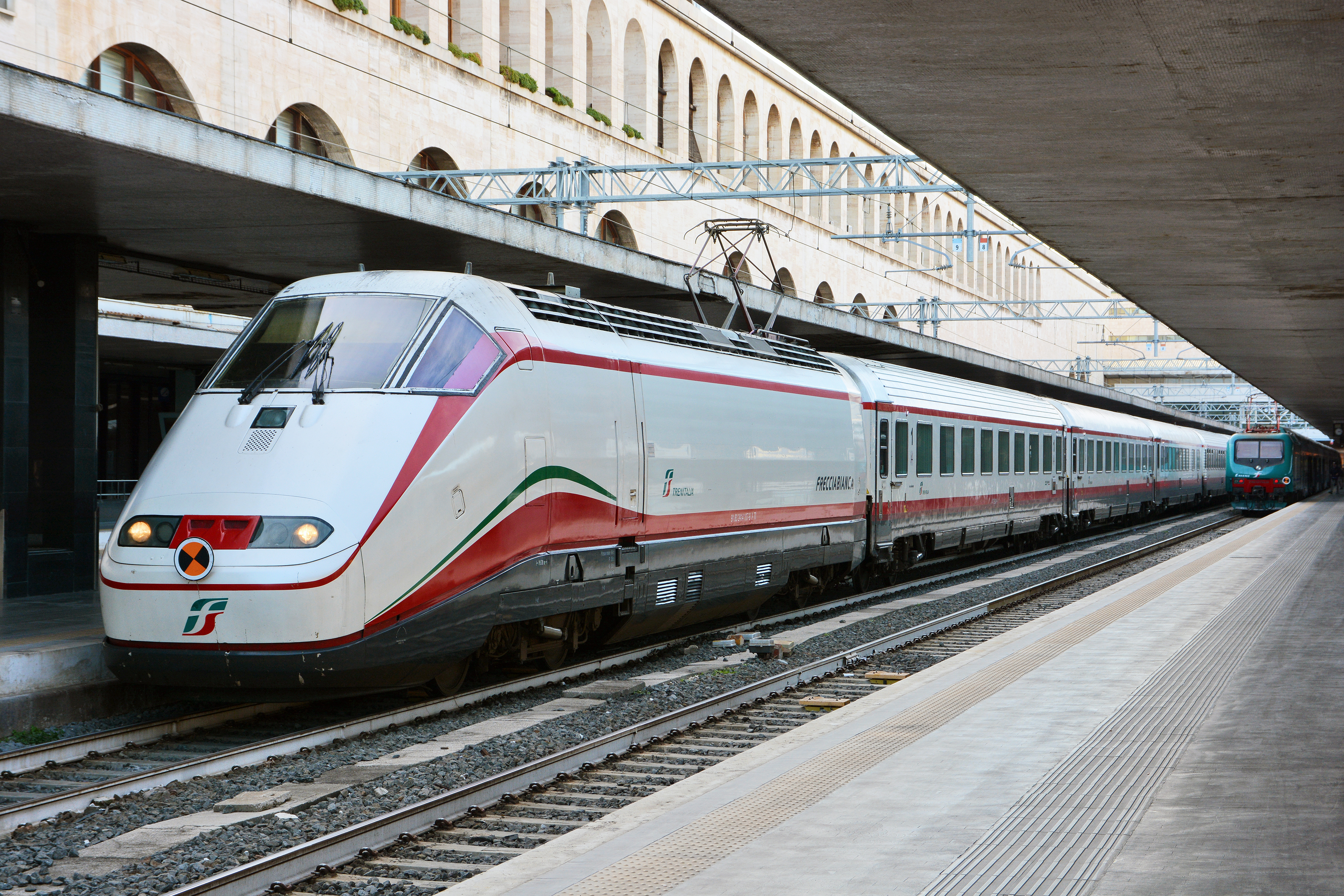
FS ETR 414 as Frecciabianca

=== Frecciarossa ===
Frecciarossa trains operate at speeds of up to 300 km/h (186 mph). It runs mostly on high-speed line and is the premier service of Trenitalia and competes with .italo, operated by Nuovo Trasporto Viaggiatori. The service is provided by ETR 500 and, since June 2015, by ETR 1000. There are four classes, namely, Executive, Business, Premium and Standard class, with a restaurant car. There are plans to increase the speed of Frecciarossa service to 350 km/h (217 mph) in the intermediate-term. Comprehensive test-runs with ETR 1000 were carried out from Autumn 2015 to the end of 2016.

=== Frecciargento ===
Frecciargento trains operate at speeds of up to 250 km/h (155 mph). In agreement to the use of Pendolino trains policy, only some sections of the railway lines of Frecciargento are high speed and it runs on conventional rail lines in the other sections. The third (ETR 485) and fourth (ETR 600, ETR 610) generation of Pendolino trains and the non-tilting ETR 700 are employed for Frecciargento trains. There are two classes (first and second class) as well as one restaurant car. According to Trenitalia's CEO Luigi Corradi, starting from summer 2022, the Frecciargento service will be progressively abandoned. The trains that operate today as Frecciargento will be incorporated, with a change of livery, into the Frecciarossa service.

=== Frecciabianca ===
Frecciabianca trains operate at up to 200 km/h (124 mph) (ETR 470 and ordinary Frecciabianca) and 250 km/h (155 mph) (ETR 460 Frecciabianca) on conventional lines. The ETR 460 and ETR 463 of the Pendolino family are used in services between Rome and Reggio Calabria, Ravenna and Genoa. FS Class E.414 and FS Class E.402 locomotives were previously also used in other lines. There are two classes and a corner bar on Frecciabianca trains.

== See also ==
- High-speed rail in Italy
- Train categories in Europe
