= FS Class ETR 500 =

Italian high-speed trainset

ETR.500 (mono-current) ETR 500 (bi-current) ETR 500 F (tri-current)
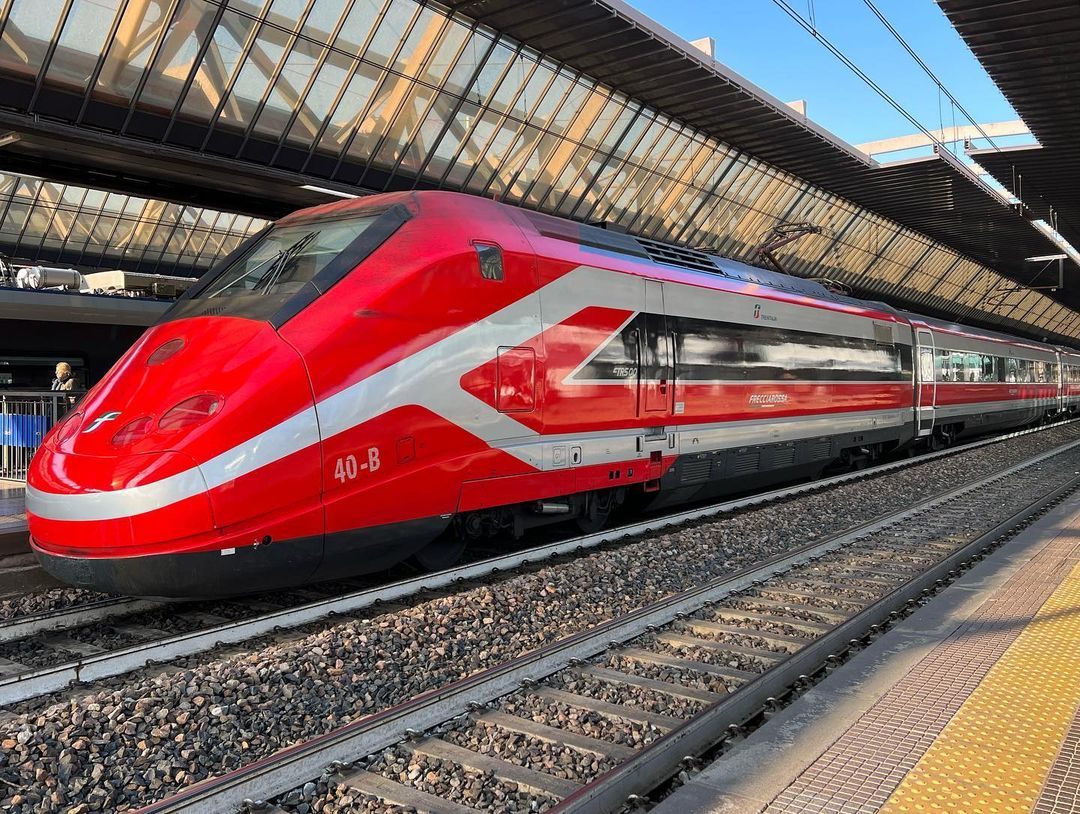
- The ETR 500 "Frecciarossa" of the Italian Railways

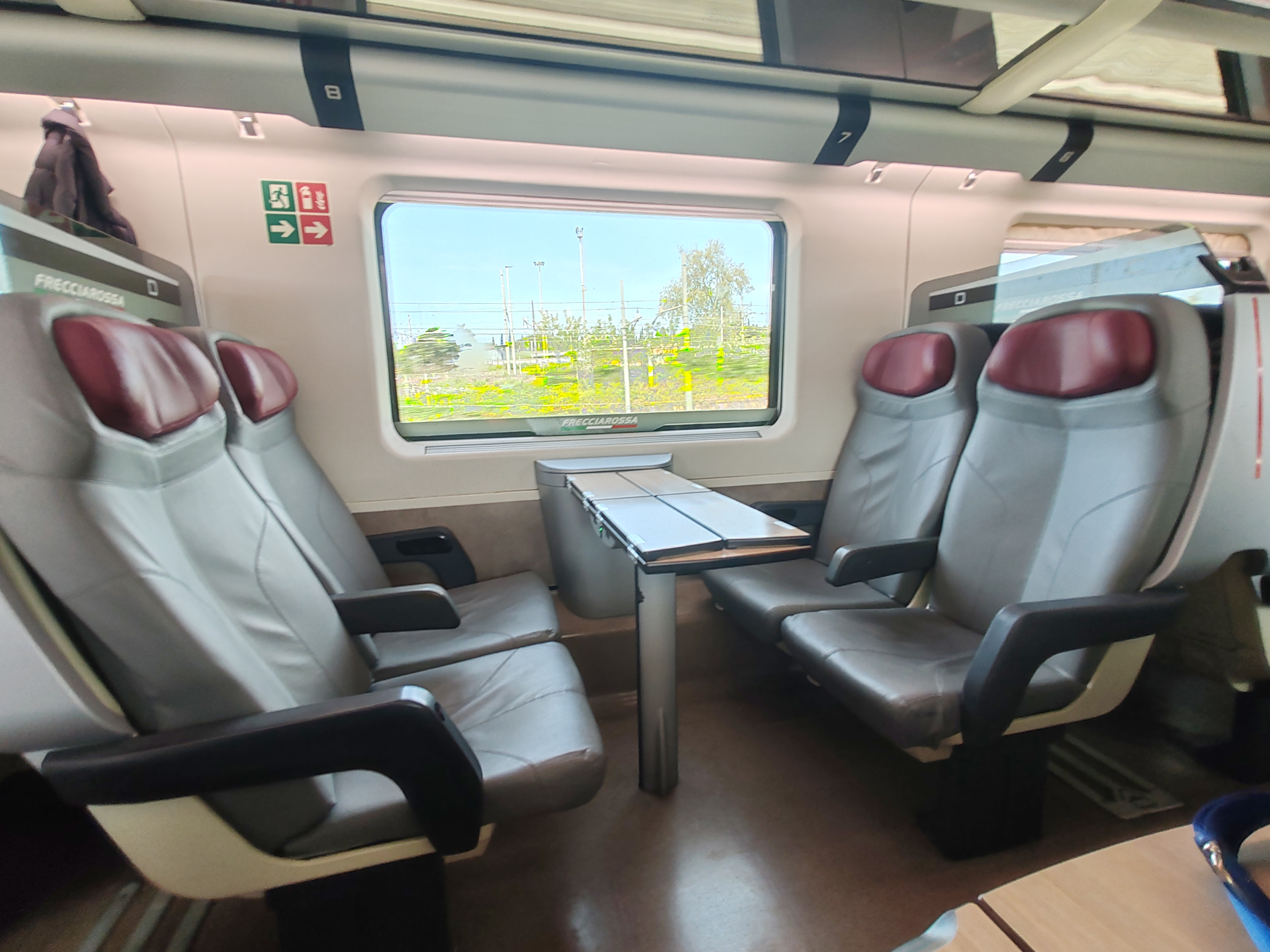
- The interiors of the Frecciarossa ETR 500 in Standard Class after 2022 refurbishment
- Manufacturers: TREVI (Ansaldo, Breda Costuzioni Ferroviarie, Fiat Ferroviaria, Tecnomasio, Firema Trasporti)
- Designer: Pininfarina
- Family name: Elettro Treno Rapido 500
- Operators: Trenitalia (current); Mercitalia (2018–2023)

Specifications
- Electric systems: Overhead catenary, 3 kV DC, ETR.500 (mono) + 25 kV 50 Hz AC, ETR 500 (bi) + 1.5 kV, ETR 500 F (tri)
- Current collection: Pantograph
- Track gauge: 1,435 mm (4 ft 8 1/2 in) standard gauge

ETR 500 (Elettro Treno Rapido 500) is a family of Italian high-speed trains built by AnsaldoBreda and introduced in 1993.

Designed under the aegis of the Ferrovie dello Stato (FS), it is now operated by Trenitalia on RFI tracks.

From 2018 to 2023, Mercitalia converted and used some ETR 500 trains for Mercitalia Fast high-speed freight train service.

== History ==
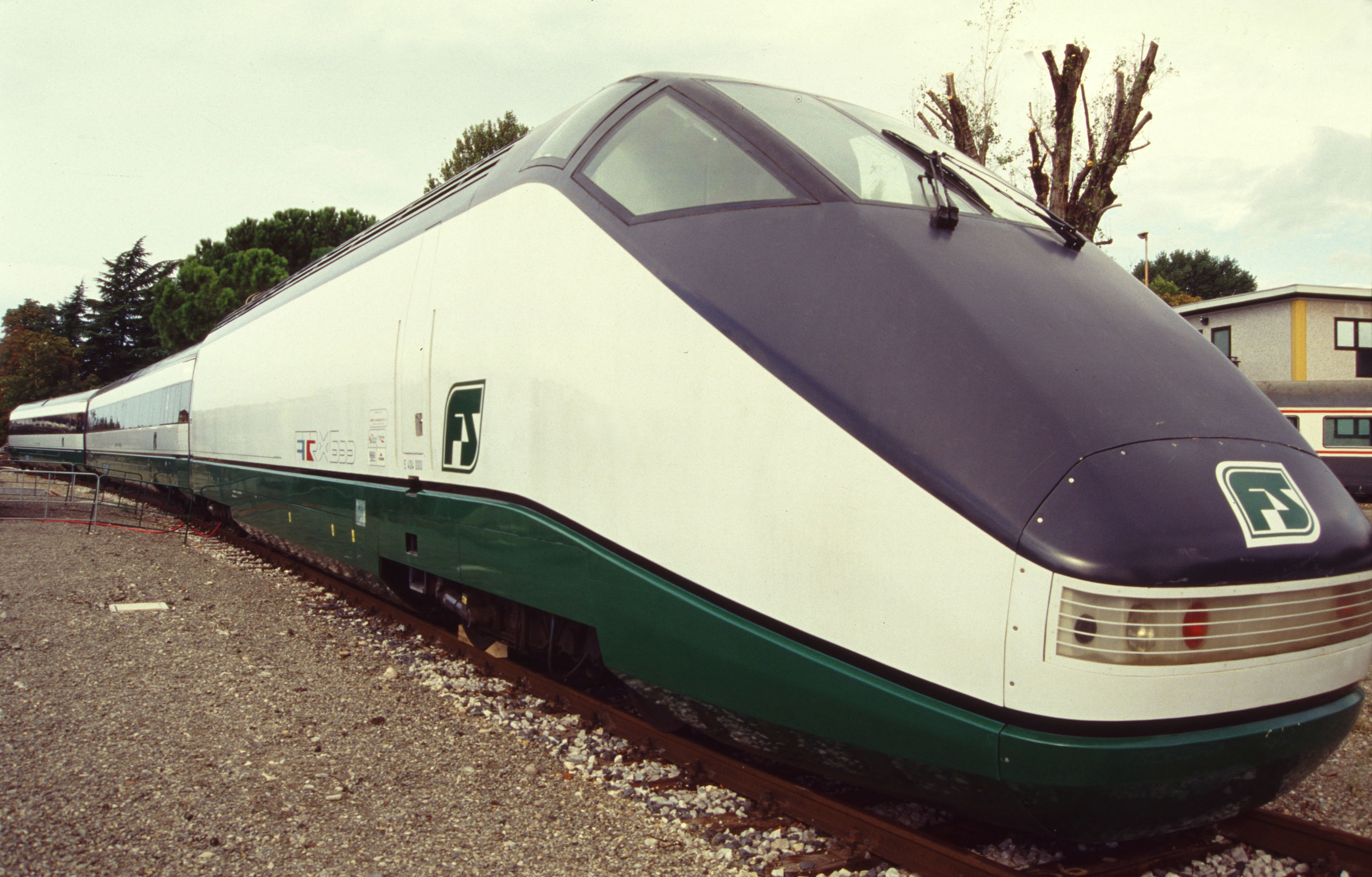
Prototype set ETR.500-X at an exposition in Bologna in 1994.

The opening of the Direttissima line, connecting Florence with Rome, in stages between 1978 and 1991 was the first high speed line in Europe. Then, in the 1990s, FS unveiled plans to build a whole new high speed network. As the larger part of the network would be suited for speeds of 300 km/h (190 mph), new, non-tilting trains had to be designed as the tilting equipment used in the ETR 450, 460 and 480 Pendolino series was not suited for speeds of over 250 km/h (155 mph).

The new train was to be built by the TREVI (TREno Veloce Italiano, "Italian Fast Train") consortium, formed by Breda Costuzioni Ferroviarie, FIAT Ferroviaria, Tecnomasio and Firema Trasporti.

== Prototypes ==
In 1988, the first prototype motorcar, called ETR 500-X and nicknamed "Remo," as the brother of the first Roman king, rolled out of the factory in Vado Ligure. It was tested on the Direttissima line in the combination of a measuring car and an E 444 locomotive, reaching a record speed of 319 km/h (198 mph).

In 1990, the two first complete trainsets, called ETR 500-Y and nicknamed "Romolo," as the first Roman king, were delivered. They were used as test units between their delivery and 1995, when the first production sets entered into service. Between 1995 and 1997, they were also used in normal commercial service when there was a shortage of normal ETR.500 trainsets.

The three motorcars of the prototype sets are now based at different locations in Italy and have been vandalised and graffitied. The middle cars of the two ETR 500-Y sets are now part of the two RFI ETR.500 test trains Y1 and Y2.

== First generation ==
ETR.500 (mono-current)
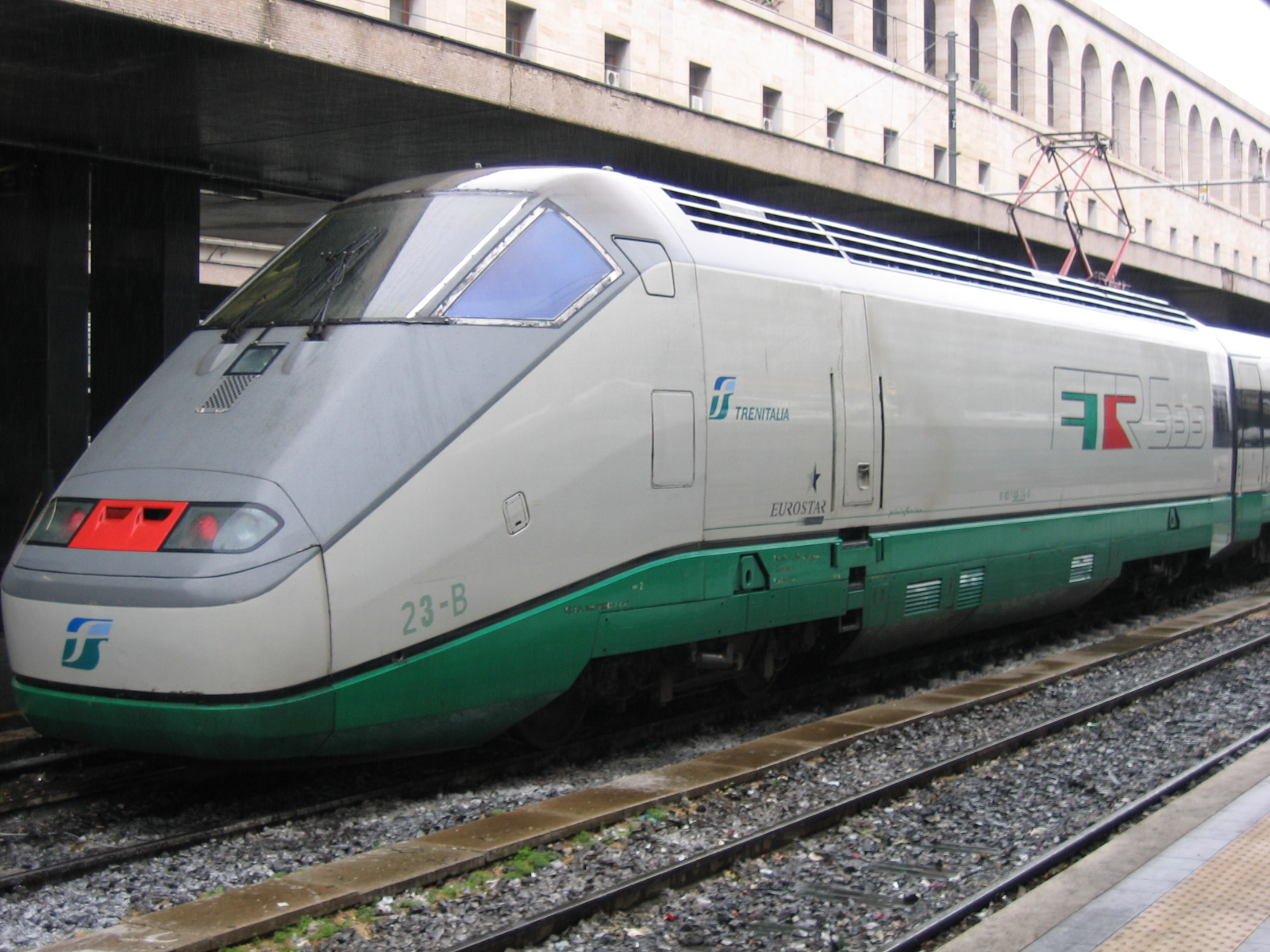
- ETR.500 mono-current powercar at Roma Termini.
- In service: 1992–2007
- Manufacturers: TREVI (Ansaldo, Breda Costuzioni Ferroviarie, Fiat Ferroviaria, Tecnomasio, Firema Trasporti)
- Designer: Pininfarina
- Refurbished: 2006–2008, transformation into E.414
- Number built: 30 trainsets
- Formation: 11-car trainset
- Capacity: 187 (1st class); 469 (2nd class)
- Operator: FS/Trenitalia

Specifications
- Train length: 327.6 m (1,074 ft 10 in)
- Maximum speed: 300 km/h (190 mph)
- Weight: 598 t (589 long tons; 659 short tons)
- Power output: 8,800 kW (11,801 hp)
- Electric systems: Overhead catenary, 3 kV DC
- Current collection: Pantograph
- Safety systems: RS4, SCMT
- Track gauge: 1,435 mm (4 ft 8 1/2 in) standard gauge

After the success of the two prototypes, FS decided to order 30 mono-current trainsets supporting the 3 kV DC supply of existing lines. Delivered between 1992 and 1996, with interiors styled by design company Pininfarina, they consist of two motorcars (numbered E 404 100 to 159), four first class cars, a restaurant car, and six second class cars. Although suited for driving 300 km/h (190 mph), they were limited to 250 km/h (155 mph) on the Direttissima as the current drawn from the catenary at 300 km/h (190 mph) would be too high. This was also the reason why a second generation, dual-voltage trains was ordered.

Major routes of this train were Chiusi-Milan, Florence-Naples, Milan-Rome Termini, Milan-Naples, Bologna-Rome Termini, Milan-Salerno, Milan-Venice, Venice-Rome Termini.

Between 2006 and 2008, the first generation trains have been upgraded with newly built E.404 6xx dual-voltage motorcars, coupled to the existing middle cars. All E.404 0xx motorcars of the older trainsets have been refurbished and transformed into locomotives of the type E.414, to haul EuroStarCity and later Frecciabianca trains on selected routes. These trains consist of two E.414 locomotives and 10 former Intercity UIC-Z coaches. Although the coaches are "normal" Intercity coaches, they will mostly remain in semi-permanent coupled formation with the two E.414 locomotives.

== Second generation ==
ETR 500 (bi-current) ETR F 500 (tri-current)
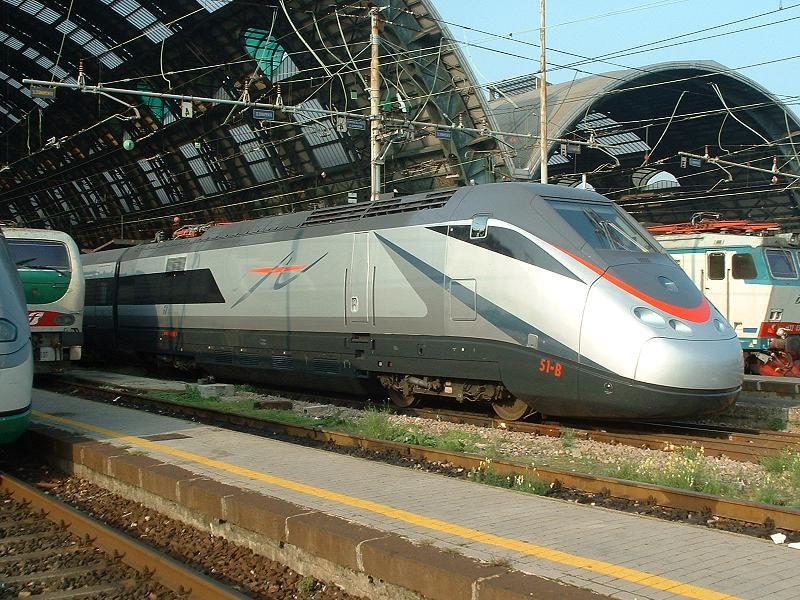
- ETR.500 "AV" at Milano Centrale.
- In service: 2000 – present
- Manufacturers: Trevi (consortium of Alstom, Bombardier, AnsaldoBreda)
- Refurbished: 2012 (replacing 1st and 2nd class with 4 levels of service)
- Number built: 30 complete trainsets + 60 power cars (for 1st generation mono-current sets)
- Number in service: 59 trainsets
- Formation: power car + 11 middle cars + power car (original-2004, 2011-present); 12 middle cars (2004-2010); 8 middle cars (ETR 500 F, Turin-Milan)
- Fleet numbers: 62 complete convoys on travel
- Capacity: From 2008 to 2012:11 middle cars: 187 (1st class); 469 (2nd class); 12 middle cars: 195 (1st class); 476 (2nd class); 8 middle cars: 136 (1st class); 268 (2nd class); From 2012: 574 seats. Executive 8 armchairs + meeting room for 6 people (coach 1); Business 159 (coaches 1, 2, 3, 4); Bar- Bistrot (coach 5); Premium 67 (coach 6); Standard 340 (coaches 7, 8, 9, 10, 11)
- Operator: FS/Trenitalia
- Lines served: Torino-Milano-Bologna-Firenze-Roma-Napoli-Salerno; Torino-Milano-Verona-Padova-Venezia-Trieste/Udine; Venezia-Padova-Bologna-Firenze-Roma-Napoli-Salerno; Milano-Bologna-Ancona-Pescara-Bari-(Lecce)

Specifications
- Train length: 327.6 m (1,074 ft 10 in) (original formation)
- Maximum speed: 360 km/h (225 mph)
- Weight: 598 t (589 long tons; 659 short tons)
- Power output: 8,800 kW (11,800 hp)
- Electric systems: Overhead catenary, 3 kV DC, 25 kV 50 Hz AC (+ 1.5 kV DC for ETR.500 F)
- Current collection: Pantograph
- Safety systems: RS4, SCMT, ETCS (+ KVB and TVM430 for ETR.500 F)
- Track gauge: 1,435 mm (4 ft 8 1/2 in)

With the new high-speed lines finally in construction, FS chose to electrify the lines at 25 kV 50 Hz AC instead of 3 kV DC as used on the classic network. This allows the trains to drive at their top speed of 300 km/h (190 mph), as 3 kV is technically limited to 250 km/h (155 mph) operation. As the first generation trains can not operate off 25 kV AC, new trains had to be ordered. As the new trains can run both off 25 kV AC and 3 kV DC, they were designated P for politensione (multi-voltage).

The new power cars of the trains feature a totally different design than the first generation trainsets, although also designed by design company Pininfarina. These new trains, delivered between 2000 and 2005, consist in original formation of 2 motorcars, four 1st class cars, a restaurant car, and six 2nd class cars. However, with the addition of a Business class car after the four 1st class cars to all trainsets, expansion to 12 middle cars was finished in 2004.

The ETR 500 P started regular service with their commercial top speed of 300 km/h (190 mph) on the Rome-Naples and Torino-Novara high-speed lines, when those lines were opened for revenue service on 22 December 2005 resp. 1 February 2006.

The second generation trains can be divided in multiple sub-series. They were delivered in three batches:

- ETR 500 P ord. '96 (sets 31-60 with power cars numbered E.404 500-559): trainset built as new.
- ETR 500 P ord. '02 (sets 1-30 with power cars numbered E.404 600-659): power cars built as new for use with cars from the 1st generation (mono-current) trainsets.
- power cars E.404 660-663: an extension of the second batch, to replace four power cars sold to infrastructure authority RFI (see below), delivered in 2007-8.

In addition, there are rebuilt and refurbished versions:

- ETR 500 F: trainsets modified for operation in France (F for Francia = France). This version was tri-current, as it was also enabled for the 1.5 kV DC system used on conventional lines in Southern France. These sets had only 8 middle cars: three 1st class cars, a restaurant car, and four 2nd class cars. Multiple trains, including sets 39, 54, 58 and 60 were converted and used for tests in France from 2001 to 2005 on the LGV Nord line. However, no type approval was granted for the trains in France even after the tests, the trains never entered regular cross-border service. Both the middle and power cars were rebuilt as standard P units in 2006-7.
- ETR 500 Y1 (with power cars numbered E.404 649, 652) and Y2 (with power cars numbered E.404 648, 621): test trains for infrastructure authority RFI, with new tractor heads attached to the old middle cars of the original Y500 prototypes. Used for the commissioning of new high-speed lines. Y1 has 8 middle cars, Y2 has 3 at present.
- ETR 500 P 8-car sets for Turin-Milan: When the Turin-Novara high-speed line was opened in 2006, Turin-Milan service started with ETR 500 P units reduced to 8 middle cars, to fit the length of the station platforms at Malpensa Airport. These trains included set 60 (part of a former ETR 500 F set) in special 2006 Winter Olympics livery.
- ETR 500 "AV": in 2005, Trenitalia introduced a new service concept for its high-speed trainsets, under the new brand name AV (for Alta Velocità = High Speed) in addition to Eurostar Italia. In the course of this, all ETR 500 trainsets received new interior and a new livery, with the "AV" logo prominently displayed on the power cars.
- ETR 500 "Frecciarossa": in 2008, Trenitalia introduced new brand names for its Eurostar Italia Alta Velocità high-speed trains that categorise them according to top speed. The new brand name for trains with top speeds in the 300–350 km/h (190–220 mph) range is Frecciarossa (meaning Red Arrow). The ETR 500,ETR 1000,ETR 600 and ETR 700 are currently the trains qualifying as Frecciarossa. The ETR 600 and the ETR 700 were added to the category of service with a announcement made on the 31st of May 2022 during a conference made by Trenitalia that announced the launch of the "Summer Experience" with a new livery for the ETR 500,ETR 600,ETR 700 and ETR 1000. Since the ETR 600 and the ETR 700 were part of the Frecciargento category, they had to be reclassified. First the ETR 700 by December 2022 and then the ETR 600 by March 2023.The trains receive a new livery with a red stripe and the brand name on the power cars.

=== Speed records ===
- An ETR 500 F test train composed of 8-car trainset 54 with motor cars E.404 500 and 526 set a record speed of 335 km/h (208 mph) between Lille and Marne-la Vallée in France on 2 June 2005.
- ETR 500 P set 31, shortened to 8 middle cars, achieved 348.5 km/h (216.5 mph) on the Rome-Naples line on 7 September 2005.
- ETR 500 P set 31 achieved 350.8 km/h (218.0 mph) (on 5 October 2005) and then ETR 500 Y2 achieved 352.0 km/h (218.7 mph) on 25 May 2006 on the Turin-Novara line.
- ETR 500 Y2, during commissioning tests of the upgraded Ankara-Eskişehir line, part of the Turkish high-speed railway network, achieved a national rail speed record for Turkey at 303 km/h (188 mph).
- ETR 500 Y1 achieved 355 km/h (221 mph) on the Milan-Bologna line on 1 March 2008 at 17:23.

The last speed record is 362 km/h (225 mph) (also trainset Y1) between Florence and Bologna. This represents the "indoors" world speed record, as the speed was reached in the Monte Bibele tunnel on the new high speed line between Bologna and Florence.

By the end of 2017, Trenitalia will have 50 new ETR 1000 able to reach 360 to 400 km/h (225 to 250 mph).

== See also ==
- ElettroTreno
- Eurostar Italia
- High-speed rail in Italy
- List of high speed trains
- New Pendolino
- Pendolino
- Rete Ferroviaria Italiana
- Trenitalia
