= Frecciargento =

Italian high-speed train

Frecciargento (Italian: [ˌfrettʃarˈdʒɛnto]; from freccia argento, "silver arrow") is a high-speed train of the Italian national train operator, Trenitalia, as one of its Le Frecce brands (along with Frecciarossa and Frecciabianca). The name was introduced in 2012; these trains were previously branded as Eurostar Italia. Frecciargento trains operate at speeds of up to 250 kilometres per hour (155 mph).

In May 2022, it was announced by Trenitalia's CEO Luigi Corradi that, starting from summer 2022, the Frecciargento brand will be phased out. The trains that operate as Frecciargento will be incorporated, with a change of livery, into the Frecciarossa service. However in November 2023, it has been announced that some Frecciabianca services will be upgraded to Frecciaargento, therefore keeping the brand for the time being.

== Routes ==
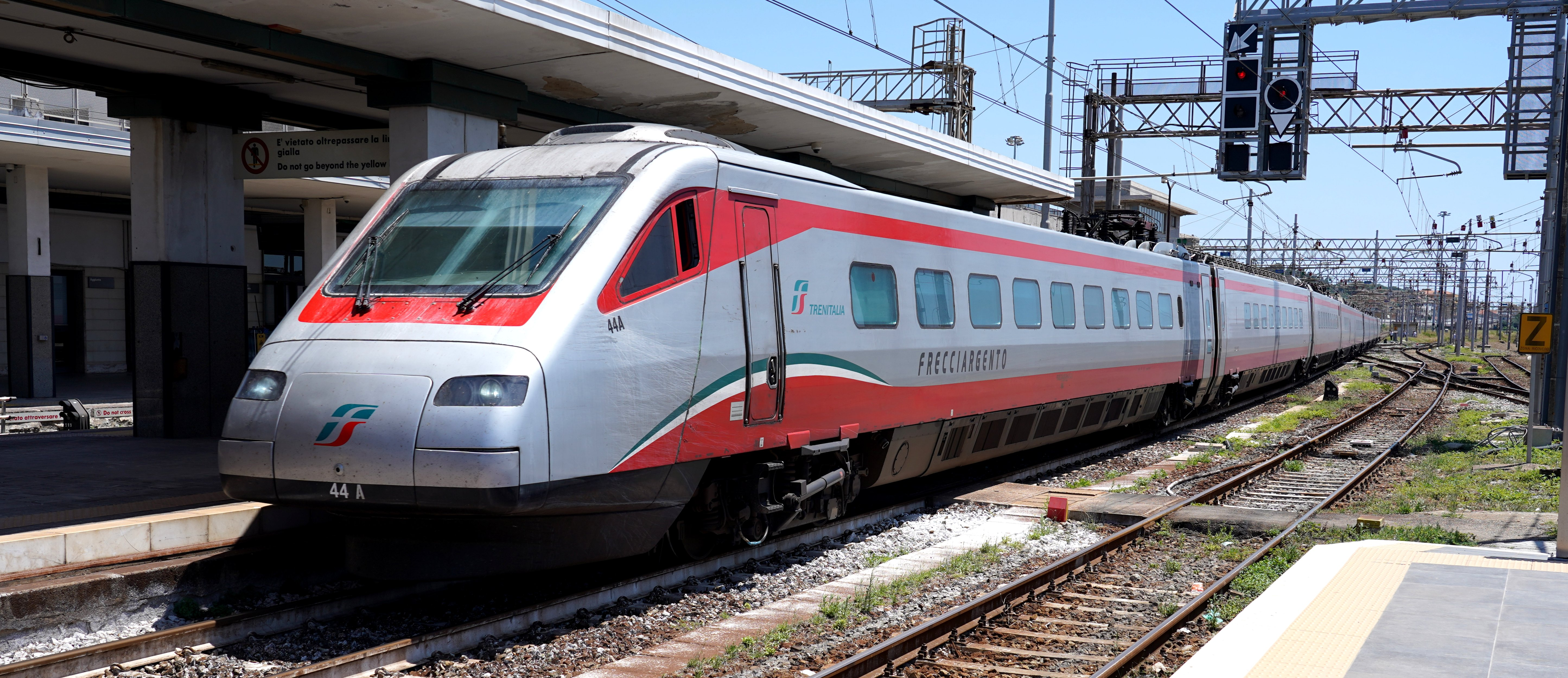
ETR 485 as Frecciargento

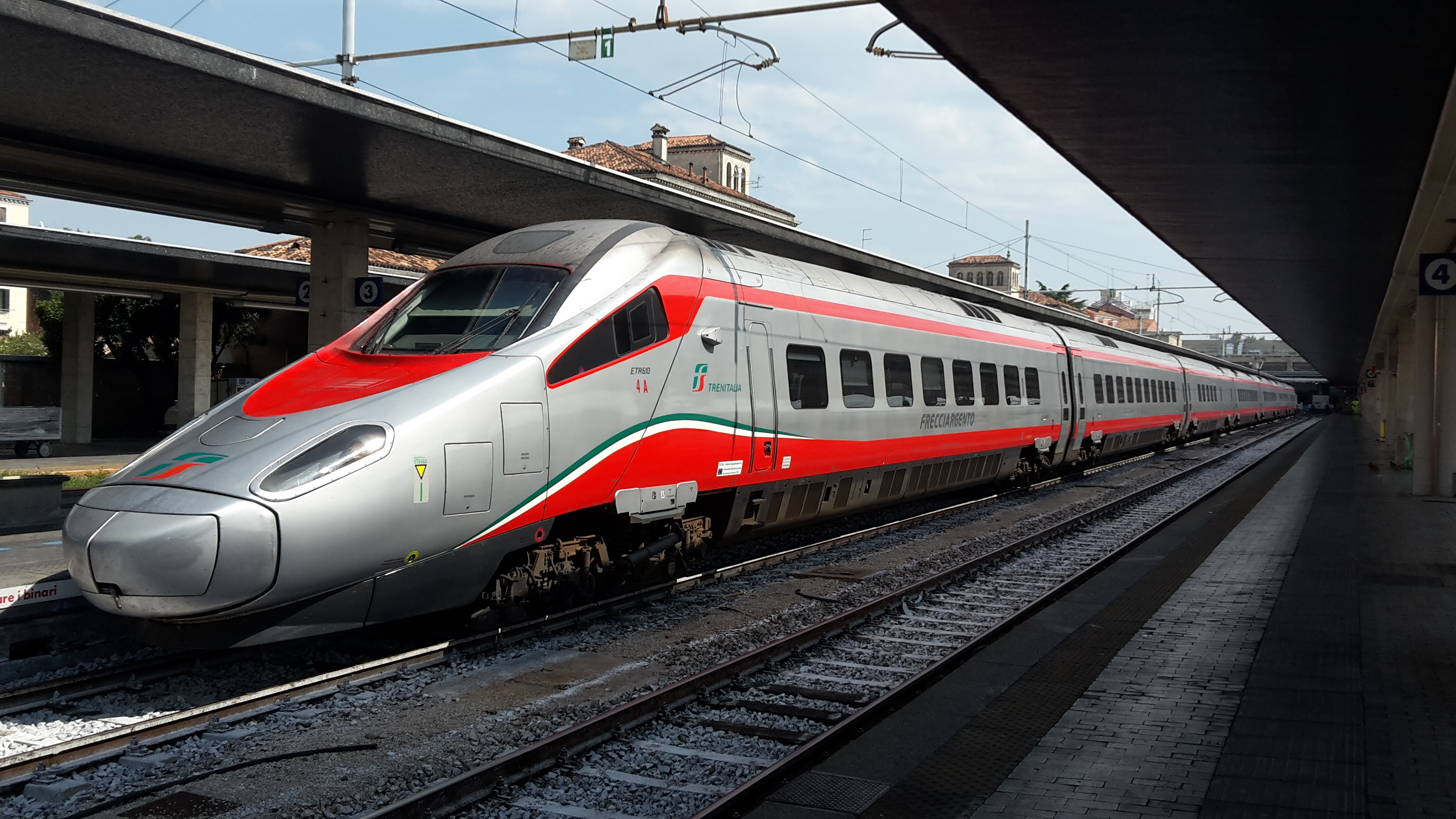
ETR 610 as Frecciargento

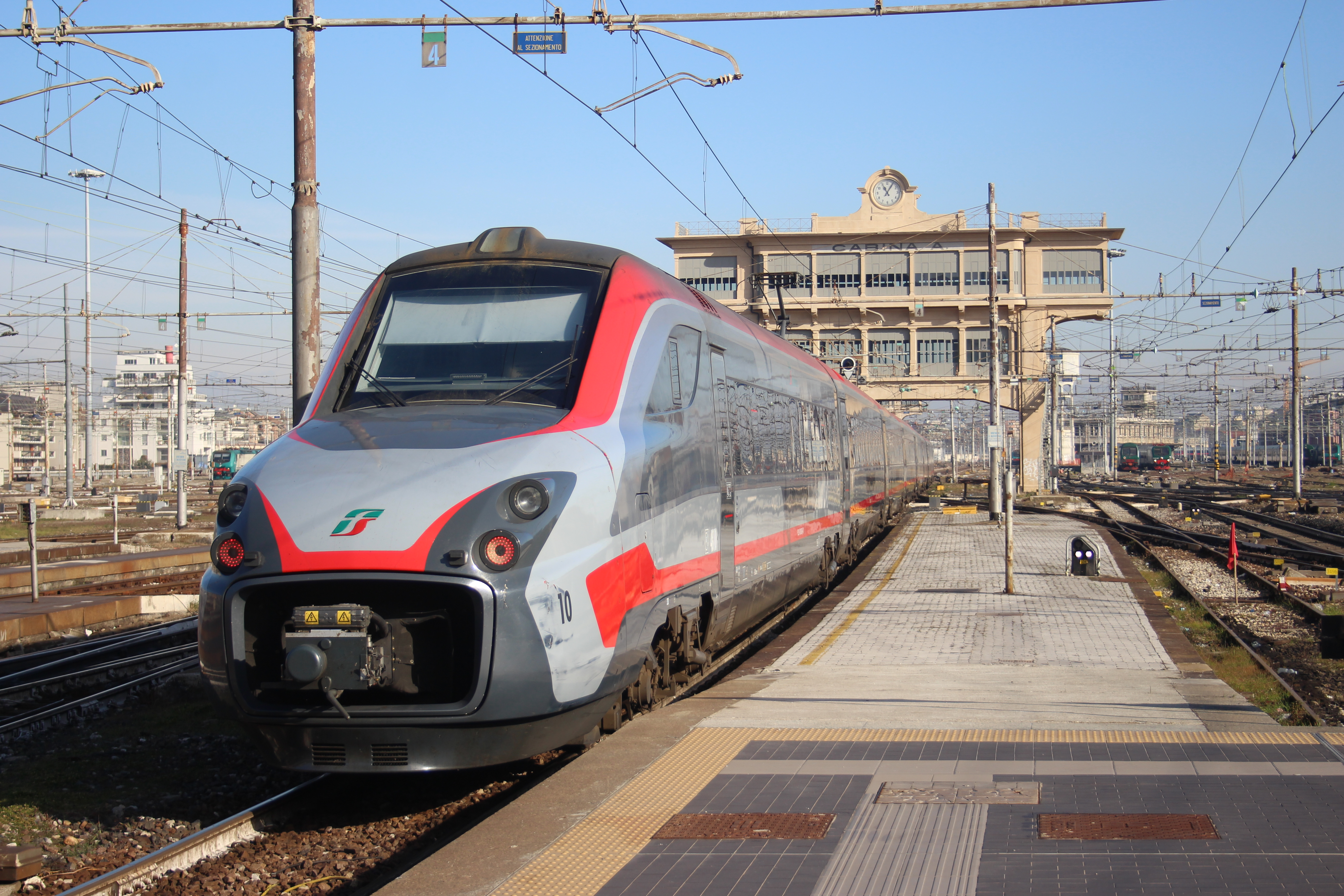
ETR 700 as Frecciargento

=== Current ===
As of June 2024, the Frecciargento brand operates on the following routes:

- Rome – Caserta – Foggia – Bari – Lecce
- Rome – Rimini – Ravenna

=== Former ===
Frecciargento trainsets also formerly operated the following services with most being upgraded to Frecciarossa since:

- Udine – Venice – Padua – Bologna – Florence – Rome
- Trieste – Venice – Padua – Bologna – Florence – Rome
- Bolzano/Bozen – Verona – Bologna – Florence – Rome
- Bergamo – Brescia – Verona – Bologna – Florence – Rome
- Mantua – Modena – Bologna – Rome
- Milano – Stresa – Domodossola – Brig – Visp – Spiez – Thun – Bern
- Milano – Bologna – Rimini – Ancona
- Rome – Naples – Salerno – Lamezia Terme – Reggio Calabria
- Rome – Florence – Pisa – La Spezia – Genoa

== Rolling stock ==
- ETR 485: tilting trains, speeds up to 250 kilometres per hour (155 mph)
- ETR 600: tilting trains, speeds up to 250 kilometres per hour (155 mph)
- ETR 610: tilting trains with ETCS capability, speeds up to 250 kilometres per hour (155 mph)
- ETR 700: non-tilting trains, speeds up to 250 kilometres per hour (155 mph)

== See also ==
- Frecciabianca
- Frecciarossa
- High-speed rail in Italy
- Eurostar Italia
- Train categories in Europe
