= FS Class ETR 450 =

Italian tilting train

ElettroTreno Rapido 450
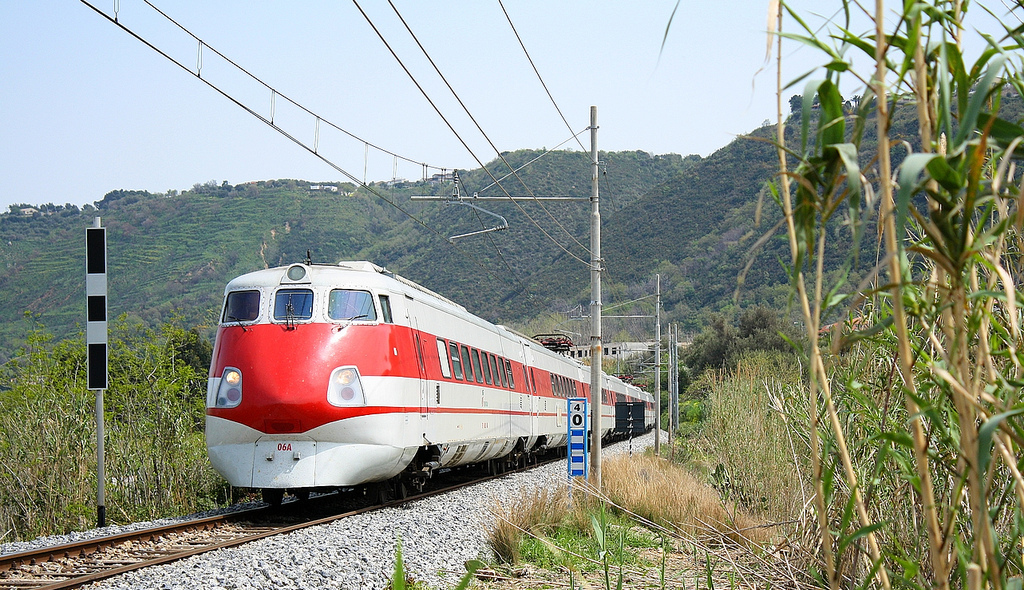
- Italian "Pendolino" ETR 450.
- In service: 29 May 1988 - 6 January 2015
- Manufacturers: FIAT Ferroviaria, Ercole Marelli
- Built at: Savigliano (Cuneo)
- Family name: Pendolino
- Constructed: 1987 - 1992
- Entered service: 1988
- Refurbished: 1993
- Scrapped: 2015
- Number built: 15
- Number preserved: 1 ( for Fondazione FS )
- Number scrapped: 14
- Formation: 6 cars ( 1st class only ), 8 cars, 9 cars ( 1st and 2nd class )
- Capacity: 390 seats: 170 1st class, 220 2nd class / 126 1st class, 264 2nd class.
- Operator: Trenitalia
- Lines served: Roma - Milano, Roma - Torino, Roma - Firenze - Genova - Savona, Roma - Venezia, Roma - Verona - Bolzano, Roma - Bari - Lecce, Roma - Napoli - Salerno, Roma - Potenza - Taranto, Roma - Reggio Calabria, Roma Perugia, Roma - Ancona, Roma - Rimini, Roma - La Spezia, Roma - Vicenza, Milano - Ancona - Pescara.

Specifications
- Train length: 233.9 m (767 ft 5 in)
- Maximum speed: 280 km/h (174 mph) (Design); 250 km/h (155 mph) (Service); 200 km/h (124 mph) (After 2004)
- Power output: 1 hour: 5,568 kW (7,467 hp); Continuous: 5,008 kW (6,716 hp)
- Tractive effort: 190–208 kN (42,700–46,800 lbf)
- Electric systems: Overhead catenary: 3,000 V DC
- Current collection: Pantograph
- Track gauge: 1,435 mm (4 ft 8 1/2 in) standard gauge

ETR 450 (ElettroTrenoRapido 450) was the first series Italian tilting train (also called Pendolino), manufactured by FIAT Ferroviaria.

== History ==
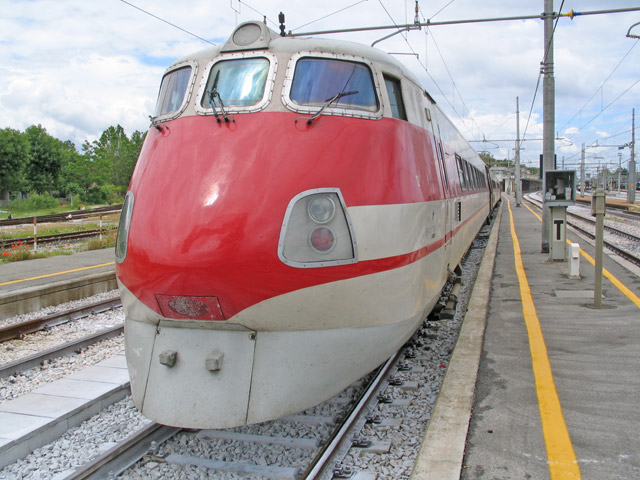
Front view

The Pendolino project was started in the 1970s by FIAT Ferroviaria. Development included a number of prototypes, the last of which was the ETR 401. This prototype was followed by the ETR 450 series units. The first train entered service on between Rome and Milan in 1988.

Every train is made up of 9 units. The trains can reach a maximum speed of 280 km/h (174 mph), service top speed was 250 km/h (155 mph). The ETR 450 were in use on the Rome–Bari, Rome–Ancona–Rimini and Genoa–Florence–Rome lines. It was relegated to lower services with the introduction of the next generation of Pendolino trains (ETR 460, ETR 480) and non-tilting high-speed trains (ETR 500).

In 2004, shortage of gyroscopic tilting controls (now out of production by British Aerospace) resulted in a decision to deactivate the tilting mechanism in the ETR 450. This necessitated a reclassification of the ETR 450, placing it in the same category as most conventional passenger rail, and requiring a decrease in its speed on turns. Overall top speed was also reduced to 200 km/h (124 mph). Subsequent years would see the ETR 450 transferred from high speed lines to use in long-distance conventional lines.

In December 2014, the last of the ETR 450 trains were removed from service, the later years of the model marked by operational delays and maintenance.

== Characteristics ==
- Construction years: 1987 - 1992
- Max. speed (in service): 250 km/h (155 mph)
- Max. tilting angle: 8°
- Total number of seats: 390 (220 II + 170 I)

== See also ==
- ElettroTreno
- Eurostar Italia
- New Pendolino
- Pendolino
- Rete Ferroviaria Italiana
- Trenitalia
- Treno Alta Velocità
- List of high speed trains
