= 1989 in rail transport =

This article lists events related to rail transport that occurred in 1989.

== Events ==
=== January events ===
- January 1 - Three railways in Norway are closed: Kragerøbanen, Numedalsbanen and Valdresbanen.

=== February events ===
- February 27 – MARC service in Bowie, Maryland, is moved to Bowie State station at Bowie State University, which had room for a large park-and-ride lot and more direct access to Route 197.

=== March events ===
- March 1 - The Abbeville–Grimes Railway (a predecessor of the Bay Line Railroad) begins operations between its namesake cities in Alabama.
- March 19 – The Toei Shinjuku Line is extended from Shinozaki to its current terminus at Moto-Yawata in Tokyo, Japan.

=== April events ===
- April 1
  - Seibu Railway's Chichibu Line extension to connect with the Chichibu Railway's Chichibu Main Line opens in Japan.
  - The central section of the Akita Nairiku Line between Hitachinai Station and Matsuba Station opens for service in Akita Prefecture, Japan.

=== July events ===
- July 5 – Opening of the Kanazawa Seaside Line connecting Shin-Sugita Station and Kanazawa-hakkei Station in Yokohama, Japan.
- July 22 – M-Line Trolley begins heritage streetcar service in Dallas, Texas.

=== September events ===
- September 1
  - Opening of Mellunmäki metro station on the Helsinki Metro in Finland, the world's northernmost metro station.
  - Guadalajara light rail system Line 1, Periferio Norte to Seriferico Sur route officially operation service to start, a first light rail system in Guadalajara, Mexico.
- September 3 – A first section of Istanbul Metro Line M1, Aksaray to Kocatepe route officially regular operation service to start in Turkey.
- September 17 – The Grand Canyon Railway officially reopens and carries passengers to the Grand Canyon National Park for the first time since 1968.
- September 24 – LGV Atlantique in France opens from Montrouge to Connerré.

=== October events ===
- October 29 - The Lexington Avenue – 63rd Street, Roosevelt Island and 21st Street – Queensbridge stations on the New York City Subway's 63rd Street Lines open.

=== November events ===
- November 11 - Berlin Jannowitzbrücke station reopens to Berlin U-Bahn trains following opening of the Berlin Wall.

=== December events ===
- December 1 - The Missouri–Kansas–Texas Railroad is merged into the Missouri Pacific Railroad.
- December - Passenger service over the South Shore Line is taken over by the Northern Indiana Commuter Transportation District.

=== Unknown date events ===
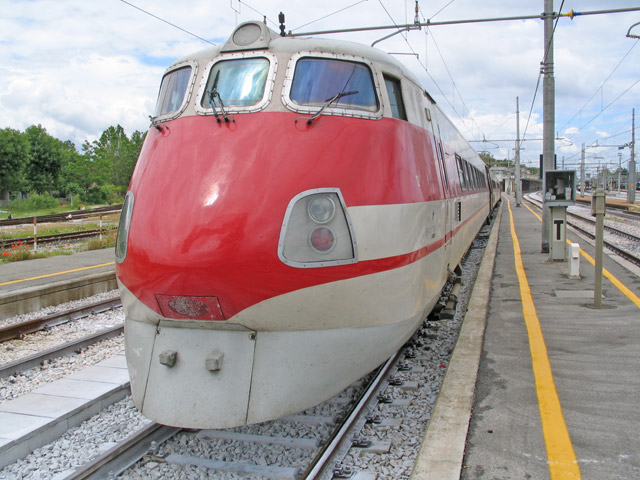
FS ETR 450 Pendolino

- The St. Lawrence and Atlantic Railroad is formed from the sale of Canadian National Railway's Berlin Subdivision.
- Ferrovie dello Stato (Italy) introduces ETR 450 trains between Rome and Milan, the first production Fiat Ferroviaria Pendolinos in regular passenger service.
- Michael R. Haverty is promoted to president of the Atchison, Topeka and Santa Fe Railway, succeeding W. John Swartz.

== Accidents ==
- March 4 - The Purley station rail crash in Croydon, near London, leaves five dead and 94 injured.
- March 6 - In the Glasgow Bellgrove rail crash, one passenger and the driver of one train are killed when two British Rail Class 303 commuter trains collide just east of Bellgrove station in the East End of Glasgow.
- May 12 - The San Bernardino train disaster occurs in San Bernardino, California, leaving six dead.
- June 4 - Ufa train disaster: A natural gas explosion near Ufa, Russia, kills 645 as two trains passing each other throw sparks near a leaky pipeline.

== Deaths ==
=== November deaths ===
- November 15 - William N. Deramus III, president of Chicago Great Western Railway 1949–1957, Missouri–Kansas–Texas Railroad 1957–1961, Kansas City Southern Railway 1961–1973, dies (b. 1915).

=== December deaths ===
- December 6 - C. L. Dellums, cofounder of the Brotherhood of Sleeping Car Porters (b. 1900).
- December 26 - Buck Crump, president of Canadian Pacific Railway Limited, 1955–1964 and 1966 (b. 1904).
