= ElettroTreno =

Line of Italian high-speed trainsets

ETR (Italian: Elettro Treno Rapido, "Rapid Electric Train") is a series of Italian high-speed trains.

== Tilting EMU trains ==
- ETR 401
- ETR 450
- ETR 460
- ETR 470
- ETR 480
- ETR 600/610 (New Pendolino)

These models are often referred as Pendolino.

== Non-tilting trains ==
- ETR 200
- ETR 220
- ETR 300 (Settebello)
- ETR 250 (Arlecchino)
- ETR 400
- ETR 500
- ETR 700

== See also ==
- New Pendolino
- Eurostar Italia
- Treno Alta Velocità
- Trenitalia
- Rete Ferroviaria Italiana
