= FS Class ETR 470 =

1990s electric multiple unit

ETR 470
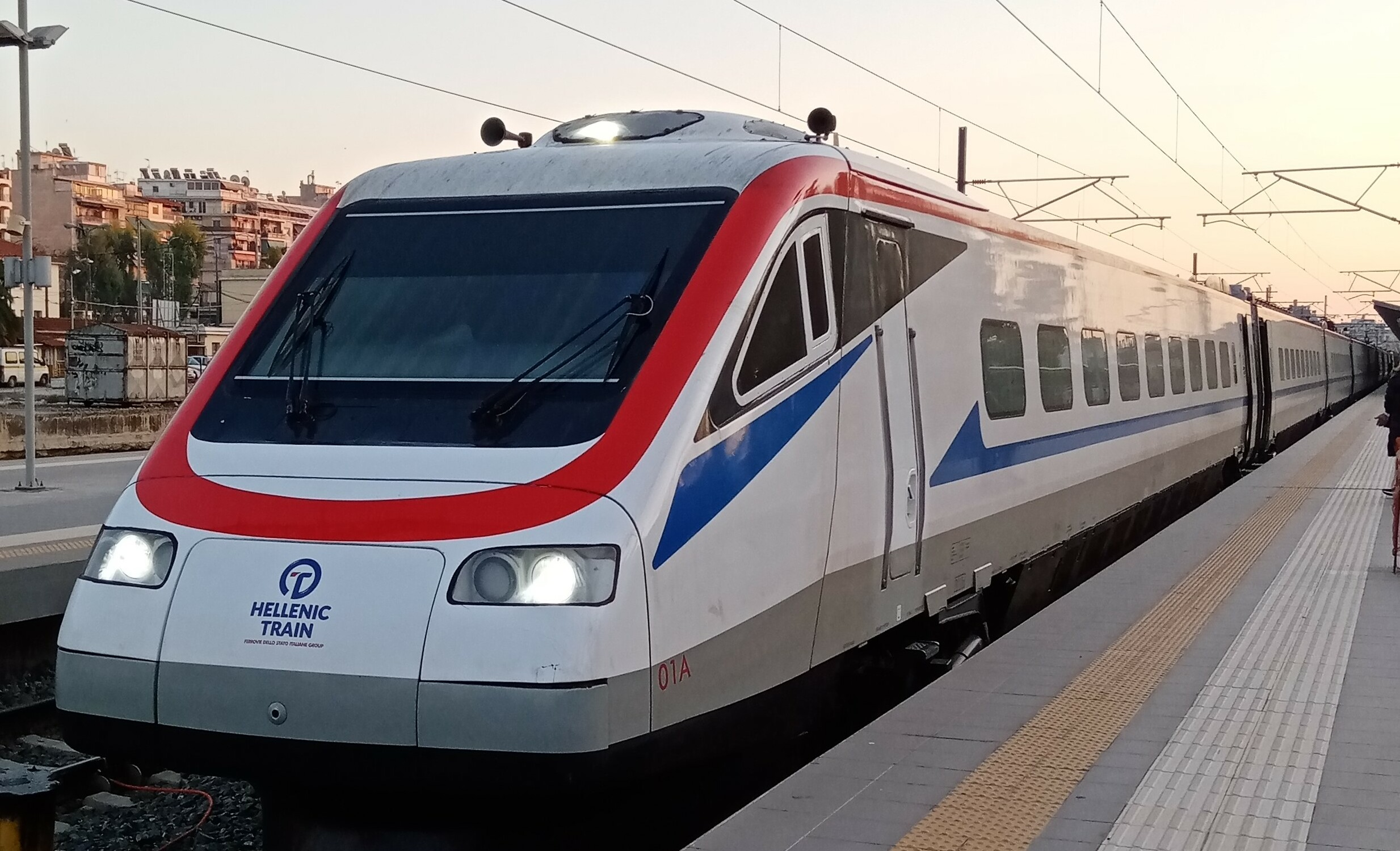
- ETR 470 in the Hellenic Train livery
- Stock type: Electric multiple unit
- Manufacturers: Fiat Ferroviaria (now Alstom), Schindler, Vevey Technologies.
- Designer: Giorgetto Giugiaro
- Built at: Fiat Ferroviaria, Savigliano (Cuneo) / Alstom (Italy)
- Family name: Pendolino
- Replaced: SBB-CFF-FFS RAe TEE II
- Constructed: 1993-1997
- Entered service: 1996
- Refurbished: 2008 & 2018-2022
- Scrapped: 2015 (Switzerland)
- Number built: 9 + 1 prototype
- Number in service: 0 (5 mothballed by Hellenic Train)
- Number preserved: 1 (in Switzerland, for possible museum purposes). Leased to Trenitalia since 31 March 2017 for service on Milano - Gotthard - Zurich / Basel lines.
- Number scrapped: 3 (in Switzerland)
- Formation: 3 first class coaches, 1 restaurant car, 5 second class coaches.
- Capacity: 475 passengers : 151 1st class, 322 2nd class, 2 for disabled persons + 29 in the restaurant coach.
- Operators: Cisalpino, SBB + Trenitalia, Hellenic Train

Specifications
- Train length: 236.60 m (776 ft 3 in)
- Car length: Head: 27.650 m (90 ft 8.6 in) intermediate: 26.900 m (88 ft 3.1 in)
- Maximum speed: 250 km/h (155 mph)
- Weight: 798 t (785 long tons; 880 short tons) (normal load)
- Power output: 6,600 kW (8,900 hp) ( hourly ), 5880 kW ( continuous ).
- Electric systems: 3 kV DC, 15 kV 16 2/3 Hz AC & 25 kV AC railway electrification Overhead catenary
- Current collection: Pantograph
- Track gauge: 1,435 mm (4 ft 8 1/2 in) standard gauge

ETR 470 (ElettroTreno 470) is a high-speed tilting electric multiple unit, which is now only operated by the Greek company, Hellenic Train. Introduced in September 1996, nine units were built for the Italo-Swiss firm Cisalpino. They were made by Fiat Ferroviaria (now Alstom), and could tilt up to 8°. Today, there are five trains in Greece.

Prior to their arrival in Greece, they performed services under the name Frecciabianca.

== Specifications ==
They can accommodate a total of 475 passengers, and also have a restaurant. They were designed by the Italian Giugiaro. They were initially designed for 3kV DC and 15kV 16.7 Hz AC operation, had four pantographs, as well as a tilting mechanism, accommodating a tilt of up to 8 degrees.

== History ==
The 9 trainsets were built between 1993 and 1996 and were originally owned by the Swiss Cisalpino. In total, they cost 16.85 million euros each.

Part of the Pendolino family, it was an updated version of the ETR 460 adapted for services under lines electrified at 3 kV DC in Italy and at 15 kV 16.7 Hz AC in Switzerland and Germany. ETR 470 trains were used for fast services between Italy and Switzerland.

Nine sets of nine coaches each were built, together with a 3-car prototype ("Train 0") which has never been used for commercial service. Since the dissolution of Cisalpino they were split between SBB (4 sets) and Trenitalia (5 sets). SBB planned to retire its 4 sets in 2014 at the latest.

Because of its long series of breakdowns, the ETR 470 was very poorly received in Switzerland. The maintenance costs were four times higher compared to the ICN. The final decision to retire the trains was taken after one of them caught fire on 17 May 2011 in Ambrì. The spokesperson for the Swiss Association for Transport and Environment described them as "not worthy of the Swiss Federal Railways", while the chief executive of Swiss Federal Railways said he wanted to "put an end to this horror". After unsuccessful attempts by SBB to sell the trains, three Swiss ETR 470 trainsets were scrapped in November 2015. ETR 470 009 owned by SBB has been leased to Trenitalia since 31 March 2017 after an Italian ETR 610 had been seriously damaged in an accident (derailment) in Lucerne on 22 March 2017.

== Export ==
Before 2021, the Italian ETR 470 were used for Frecciabianca high-speed services. It was decided in 2019, that these would be used on the Athens – Thessaloniki railway line run by Ferrovie dello Stato Italiane subsidiary, Hellenic Train. Units would be converted for use in Greece, the existing 3 kV DC equipment was to be replaced with 25 kV 50 Hz equipment and they were to be fitted with ETCS onboard equipment. In August 2018, a similar ETR 485 unit was transferred to Greece for testing purposes, in anticipation of the ETR 470 fleet's arrival. This unit, though, was not designed for the Greek network and so it was decided instead to launch the ETR 470s, which were originally expected to come in 2019 with the completion of electrification and testing of the ETCS. However, in February 2020, with the Hellenic Train depot not yet ready to receive them delivery was delayed. Instead of arriving in the summer of 2020, delivery was postponed until the end of 2020 or the beginning of 2021. The delivery was delayed even further, so the first unit was scheduled to arrive on 18 January 2021 in Thessaloniki via a route from Piacenza. The first ETR 470 train completed the control tests on 10 January 2021 and departed from Milan for Thessaloniki where it arrived on 16 January 2021, two days ahead of schedule. Three trains arrived in Greece in 2021, the fourth in January 2022. On May 15, 2022 the trains started operating on the connection between Thessaloniki and Athens. Due to extensive maintenance issues, all were removed from service by November 2024.

== Liveries ==
=== Original livery ===
The original livery included green, black and blue horizontal stripes and red elements below the front, all on white surface, which covered most of the vehicles.

=== Second livery ===
This colouring consists of a blue wavy stripe on the side in silver colour, while the red elements were kept under the front from the previous livery. This livery is still used today, in some variations with the logos of the newer companies (i.e. CIS and FS.)

=== Third livery ===
Hellenic train uses ETR 470 trains in Greece in new livery. The car body is painted white with a grey stripe above the battery boxes, while the underskirt and the plows are painted black. A blue half-arrow starts from the first passenger window running down the length of the train and ends at the other end. Also, there is a red line which also runs down the length of the train, follows the cab slope and curves below the windscreen. Last, there is a black triangle that surrounds the side cab windows and a smaller blue triangle below those windows.

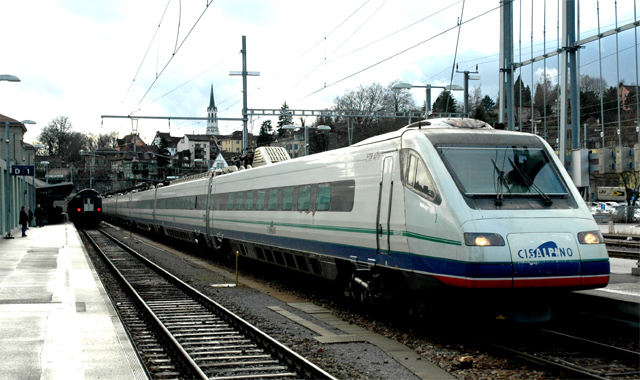
Cisalpino original livery. Here, ETR 470.1 on 16 February 2006 in Schaffhausen to Stuttgart.

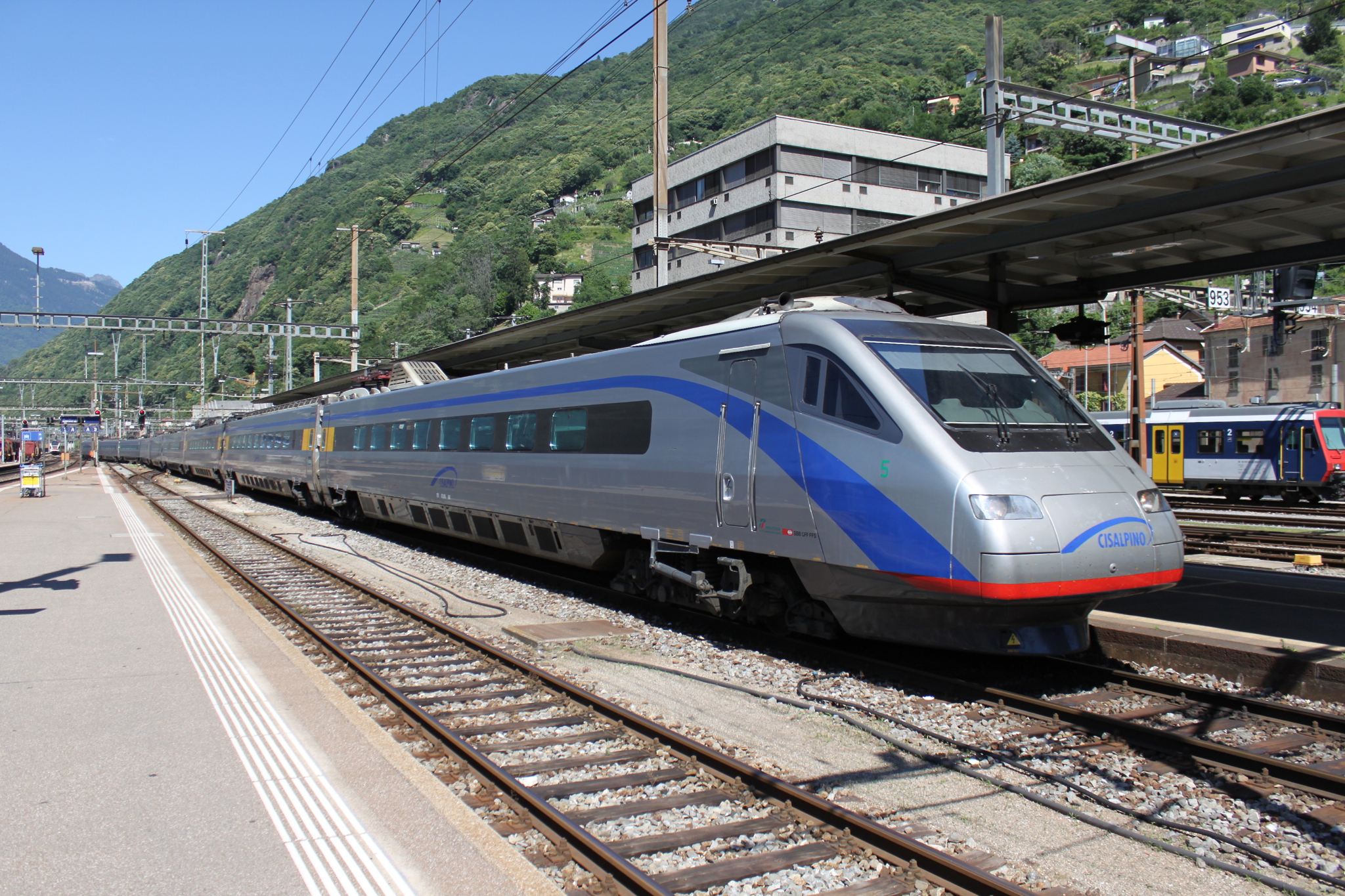
Second Cisalpino livery (Original version). Here, ETR 470 005 arrives at Bellinzona Railway Station on CIS 19 from Zurich to Milan in 2009

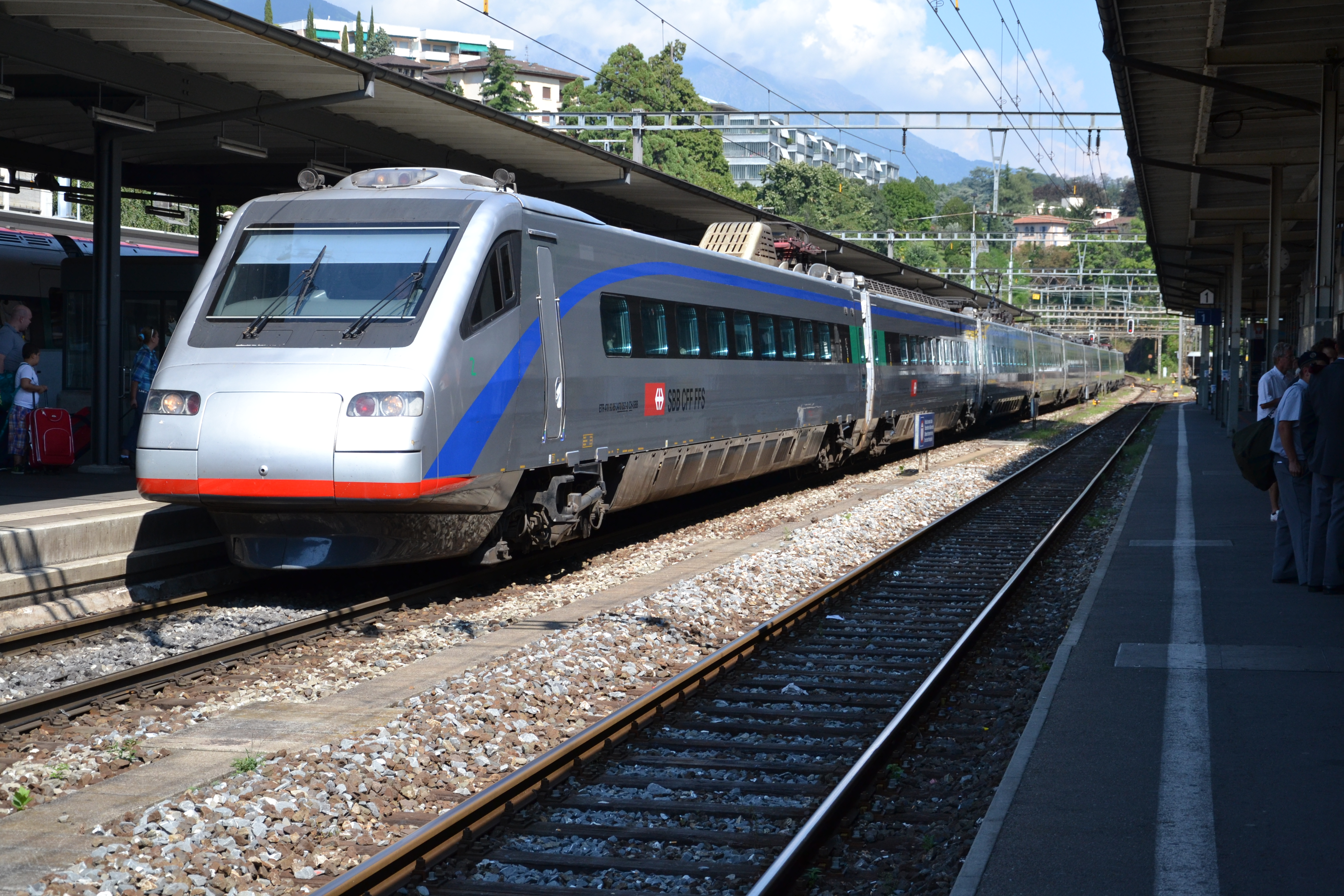
Second Cisalpino livery (CIS version). Here, 470 002 as Eurocity 15 to Milan Central Station in Lugano in 2013

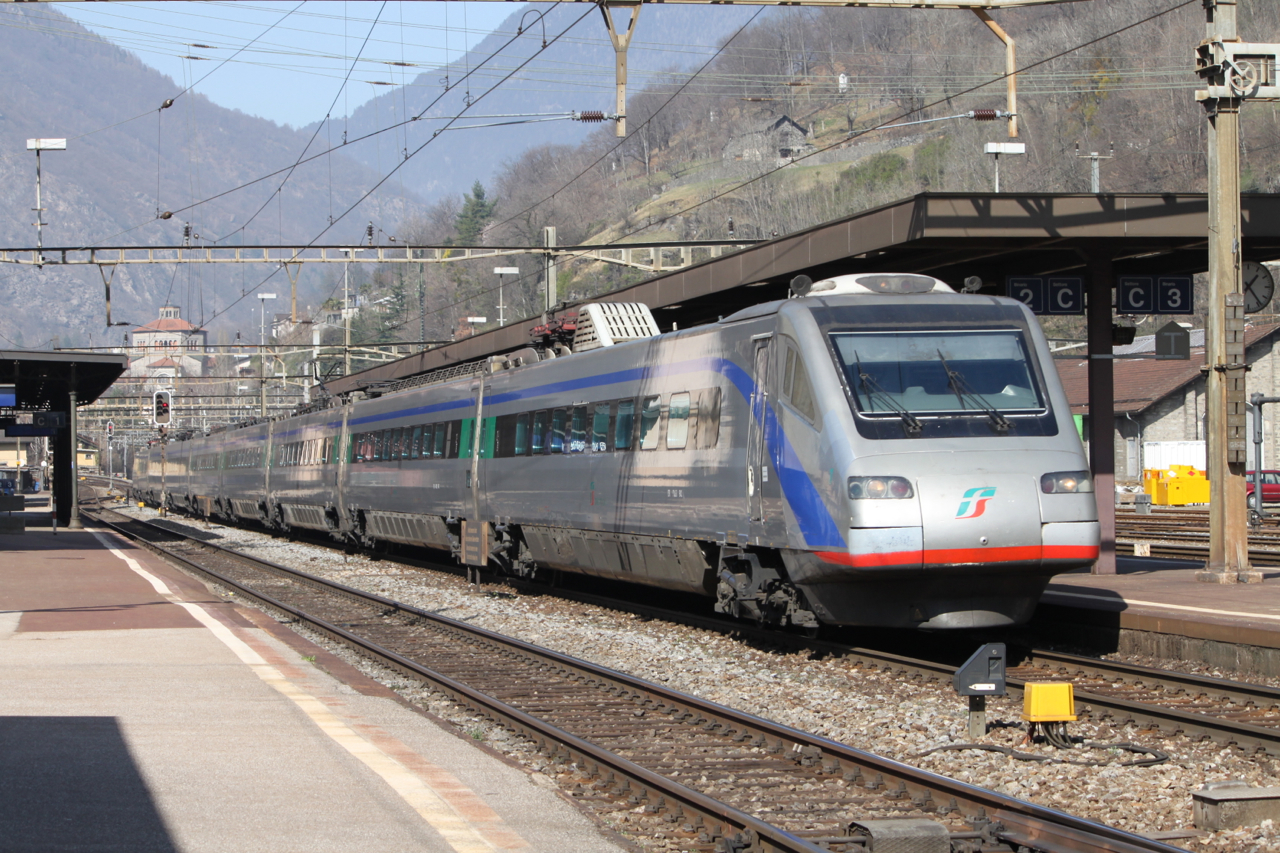
Second Cisalpino livery (CIS version). Here, the ETR 470 001 passes through Biasca Railway Station while traveling as EuroCity 17 from Zurich to Milan in 2012

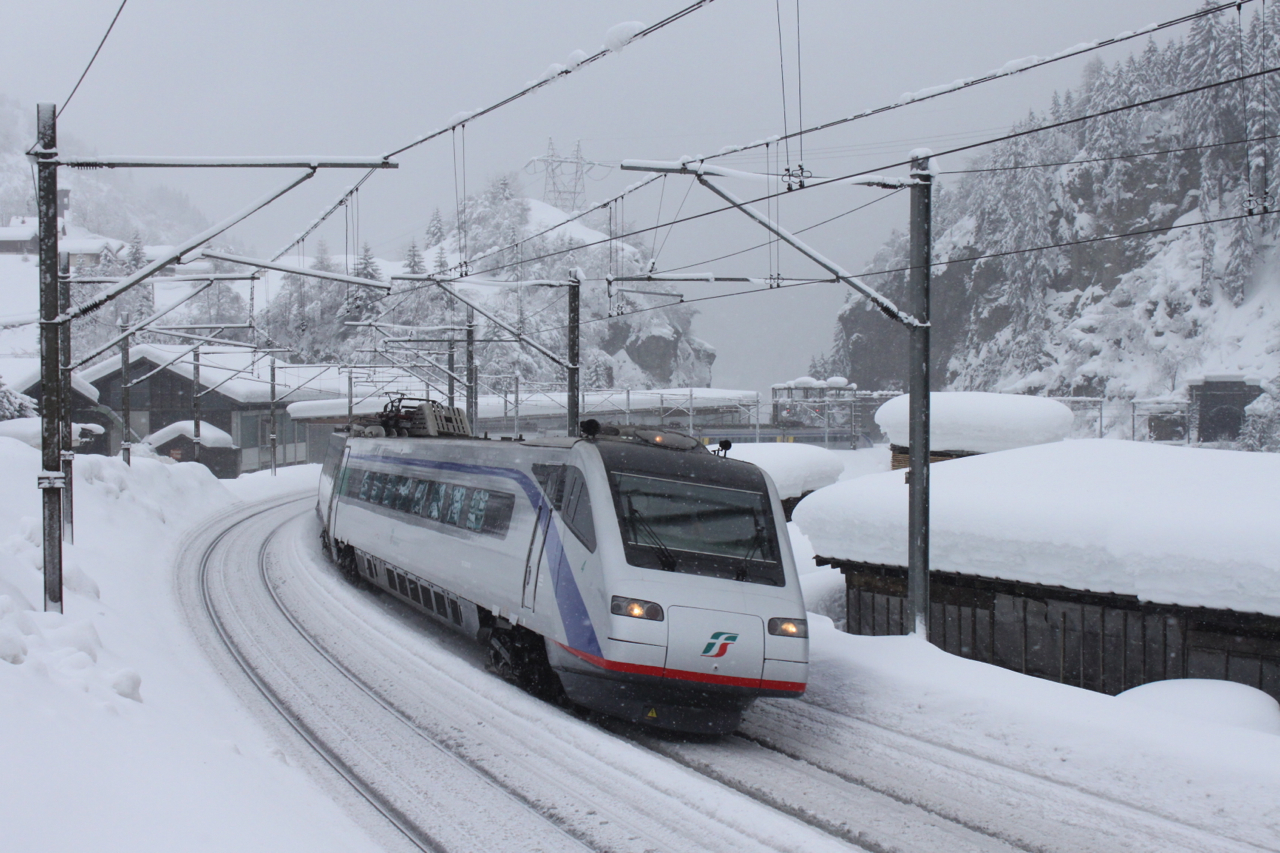
ETR 470 in the Second Cisalpino livery (CIS version).

== See also ==
- New Pendolino
- Treno Alta Velocità
- List of high speed trains
