= FS Class ETR 600 =

Italian high-speed trainset

ETR 600
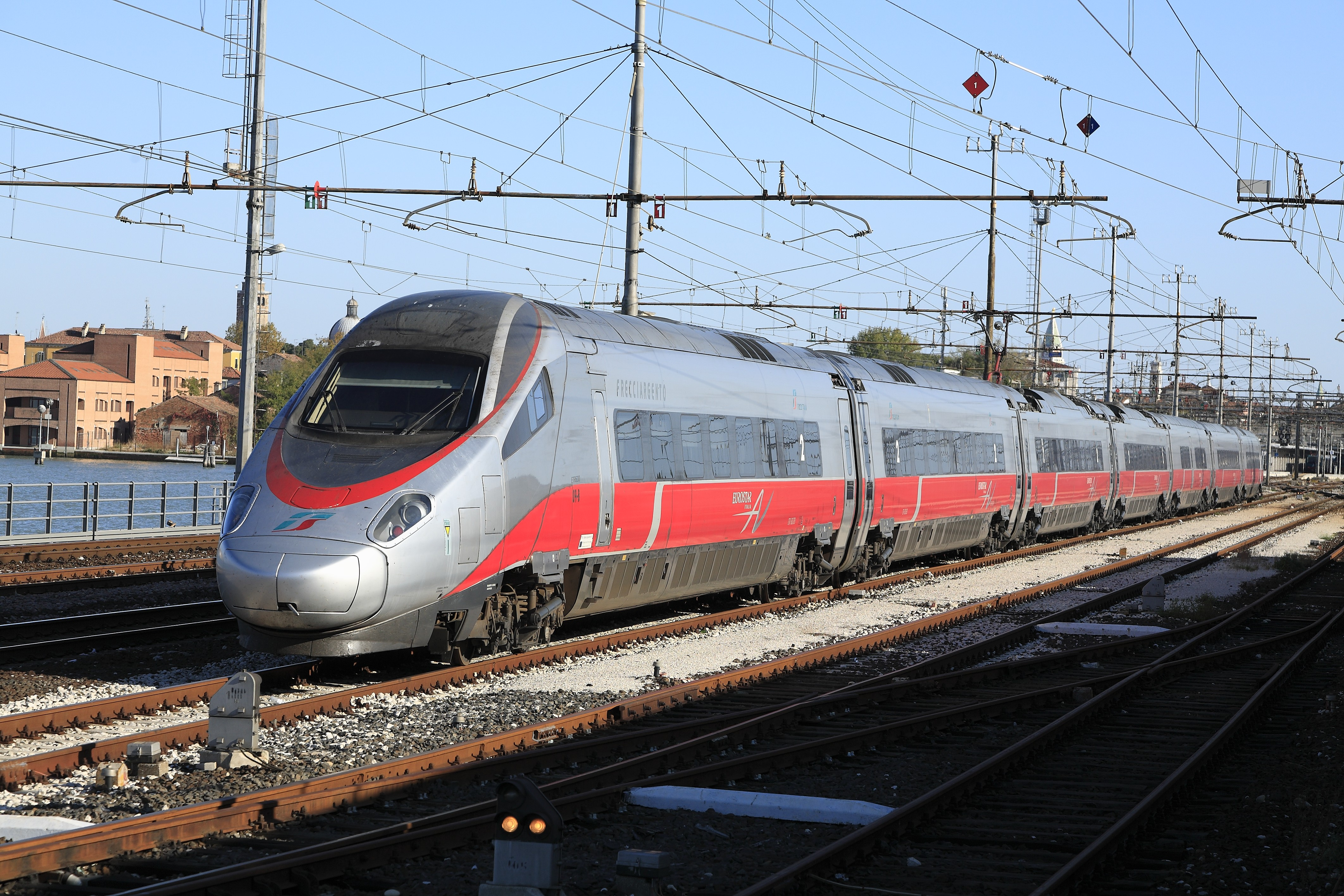
- ETR 600 at Venezia Santa Lucia
- In service: 2008 – present
- Manufacturer: Alstom
- Family name: New Pendolino
- Constructed: 2007 – 2008
- Number built: 28
- Operator: Trenitalia

Specifications
- Train length: 187.4 m (614 ft 10 in)
- Car length: 26.2 m (85 ft 11 1/2 in)
- Width: 2.83 m (9 ft 3 3/8 in)
- Maximum speed: 250 km/h (155 mph)
- Power output: 5,500 kW (7,376 hp)
- Electric system: 3 kV DC or 25 kV 50 Hz Overhead catenary
- Track gauge: 1,435 mm (4 ft 8 1/2 in) standard gauge

The ETR 600 (Elettro Treno Rapido 600) is a class of high-speed trains with tilting technology built by Alstom Ferroviaria, which belong to the fourth generation of the Pendolino family. Due to the active tilting technology, the car bodies can be tilted by up to 8 degrees for higher speeds over curves. The design of the ETR 600 comes from Giorgetto Giugiaro.

== History ==
Trenitalia ordered 28 new trainsets, which were delivered in mid-2008. In December 2008, the design was used for the first time in the regular service between Rome and Bari.

From December 2008, Trenitalia introduced new brand names for categorising trains according to their maximum speed. The second fastest train category - after Frecciarossa (Red Arrow) - is Frecciargento (Silver Arrow), for trains with maximum speeds between 250 and 285 km/h. With this, the trains operate as "ETR 600 Frecciargento" and "ETR 610 Frecciargento". With the brand names, new color schemes were also introduced, which the FS presented on 13 November 2008.

The car bodies developed by Alstom were built by the Alstom plants in Savigliano near Turin, and the electrical equipment in Sesto San Giovanni near Milan.

== Technical data ==
A multiple unit consists of seven coaches. Two sets of wheels at the end and neighbouring middle wagons are driven. A total of 430 seats and two wheelchair spaces are offered. With a carriage length of 26.2 m of the vehicle bodies built with aluminium extruded profiles, the train length of 187.4 m with 2.83 m carriage width results. The maximum axle load (loaded) is 16.5 t, so that the pulling mass of an empty train is 387 t and an occupied (all seats occupied) is 421 t.

The units are approved for a speed of 250 km/h, although 280 km/h was reached during test drives. The continuous electrical power is 5500 kW. The tilt system is electro-hydraulic and is controlled by a redundantly constructed HVAC control system. The ETR 600 intended for Italian domestic traffic are designed for dual-system capability for the 3 kV DC voltage and 25 kV AC voltage with a frequency of 50 Hz in the existing network, the ETR 610 additionally for an AC voltage of 15 kV at 16.7 Hz.

== See also ==
- Eurostar Italia
- China Railway CRH5
- Alstom EMU250
