= FS Class E.414 =

Class of Italian electric locomotives

FS class E.414
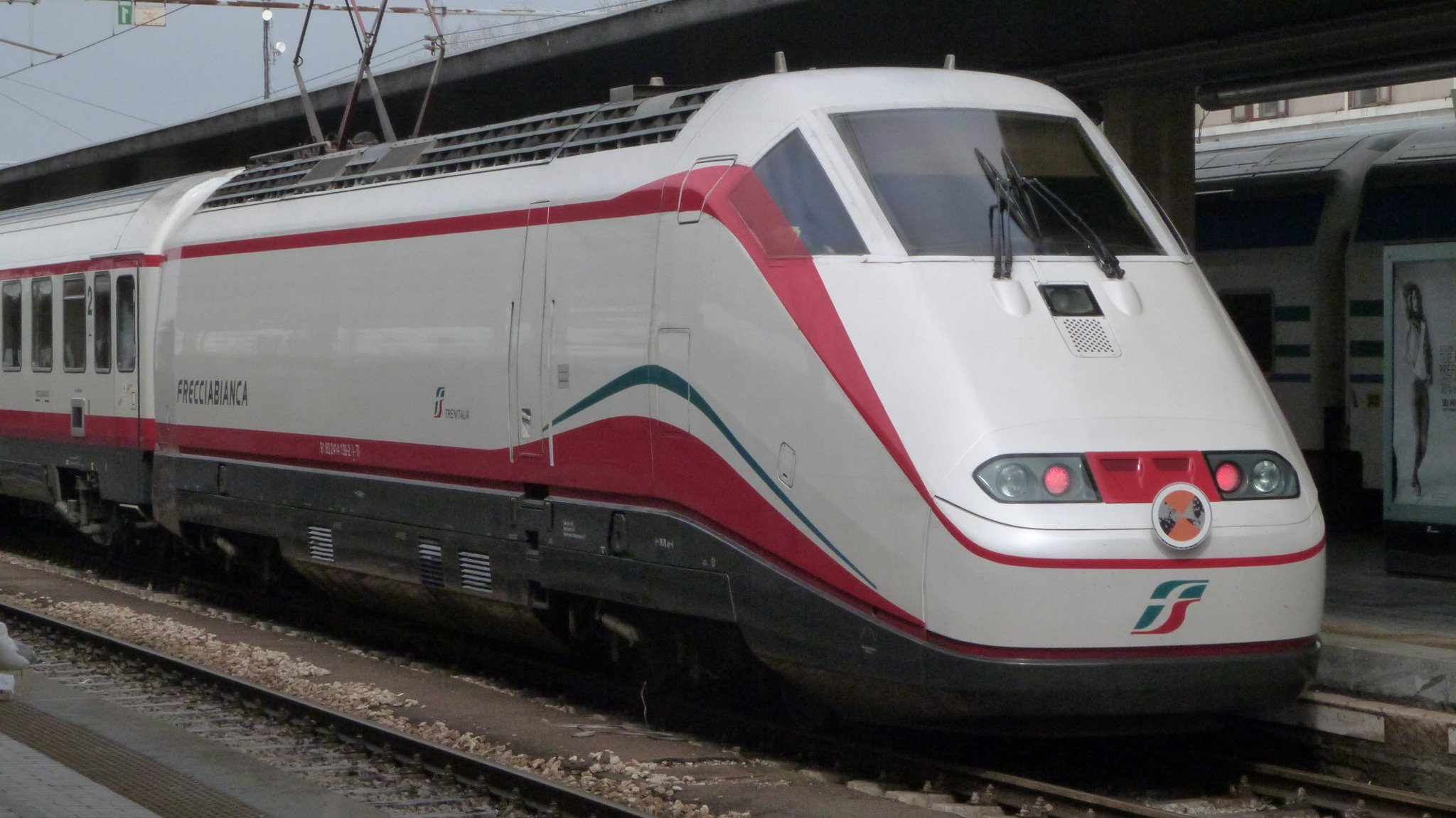
- A E.414N in the Frecciabianca livery at Santa Lucia Station, Venice
Type and origin
- Power type: Electric
- Designer: Pininfarina
- Builder: TREVI (Ansaldo, Breda Costuzioni Ferroviarie, Fiat Ferroviaria, Tecnomasio, Firema Trasporti)
- Build date: 1994-1996, reconverted from 2007
Specifications
- Configuration
  - UIC: Bo′Bo′
- Gauge: 1,435 mm (4 ft 8 1/2 in) standard gauge
- Wheel diameter: 1.100 m (43.31 in)
- Wheelbase: 11.450 m (37 ft 6 3/4 in) between bogies 3.000 m (118.11 in) between axles of each bogie
- Length: 15.540 m (50 ft 11 3/4 in)
- Loco weight: 68 short tons (61 long tons; 62 t)
- Electric system/s: 3,000 V DC Catenary
- Current pickup: Pantograph
- Traction motors: DC series
Performance figures
- Maximum speed: 250 km/h (160 mph) original 200 km/h (120 mph) after reconversion
- Power output: 4,400 kW (5,900 hp)
- Tractive effort: 200 kN (45,000 lb_{f})
Career
- Operators: FS Trenitalia
- First run: 1995

The E.414 is a class of electric locomotives operated by Trenitalia. They were built in 1994–1996, in a total of 60 units, as the E.404 class used in pairs in the ETR 500 high-speed trains. Starting from 2007, they were refurbished to be used, in double units, to haul Frecciabianca prestige trains.
