= Frecciabianca =

Italian high-speed train

Frecciabianca (Italian: [ˌfrettʃaˈbjaŋka]; from freccia bianca, "white arrow") is a high-speed train operated by Trenitalia, Italy's national train operator, and one of its Le Frecce brands, along with Frecciarossa and Frecciargento. Frecciabianca was introduced in 2011, replacing Eurostar Italia. Frecciabianca trains operate at speeds up to 200 km/h (124 mph).

== Routes ==
As of June 2024, Frecciabianca operates on the following routes:

- Rome-Pisa-La Spezia-Genoa (with some continuing to either Milan or Turin)
- Rome-Ancona-Rimini-Ravenna (planned to be upgraded to Frecciargento)

== Rolling stock ==
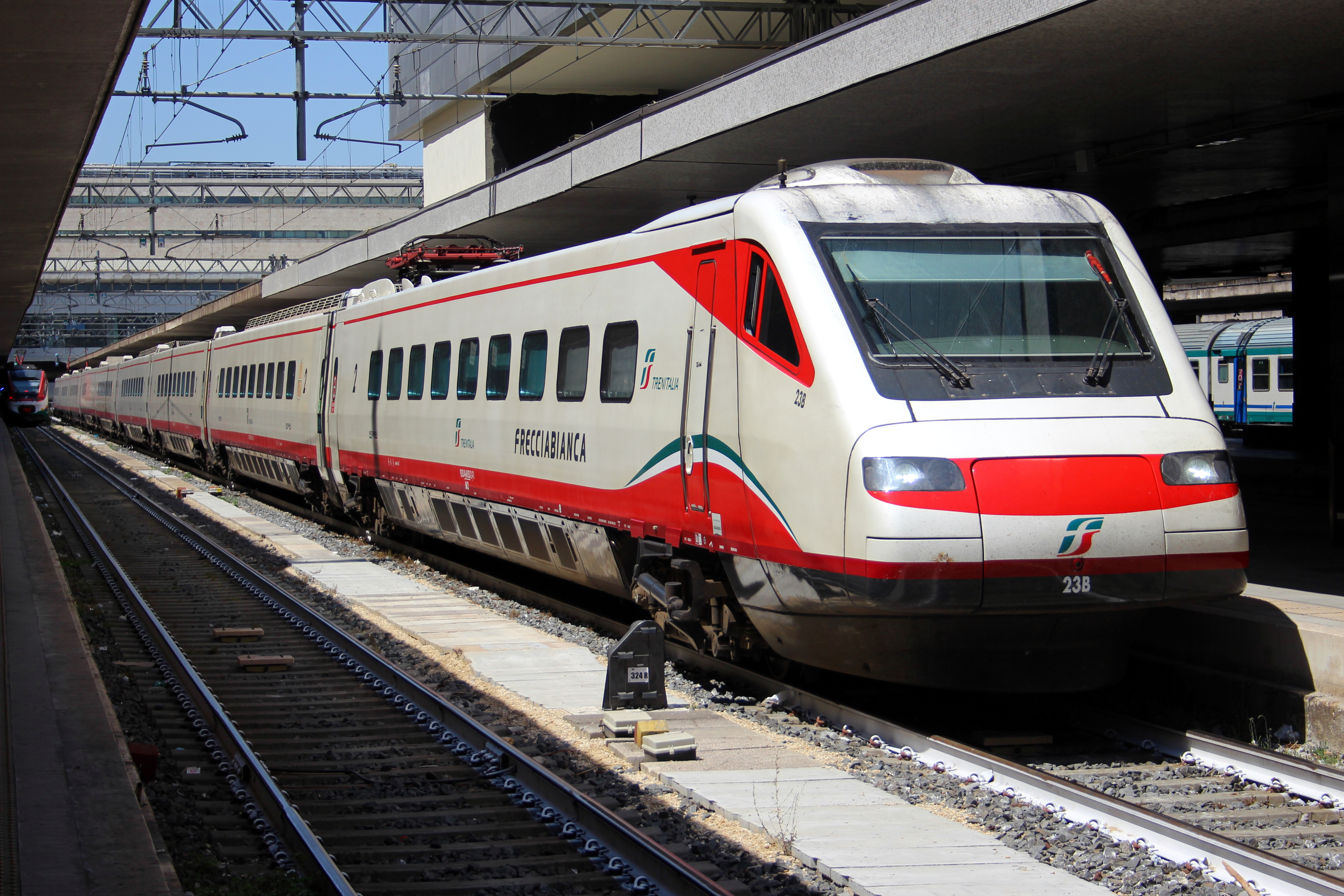
Frecciabianca ETR 460

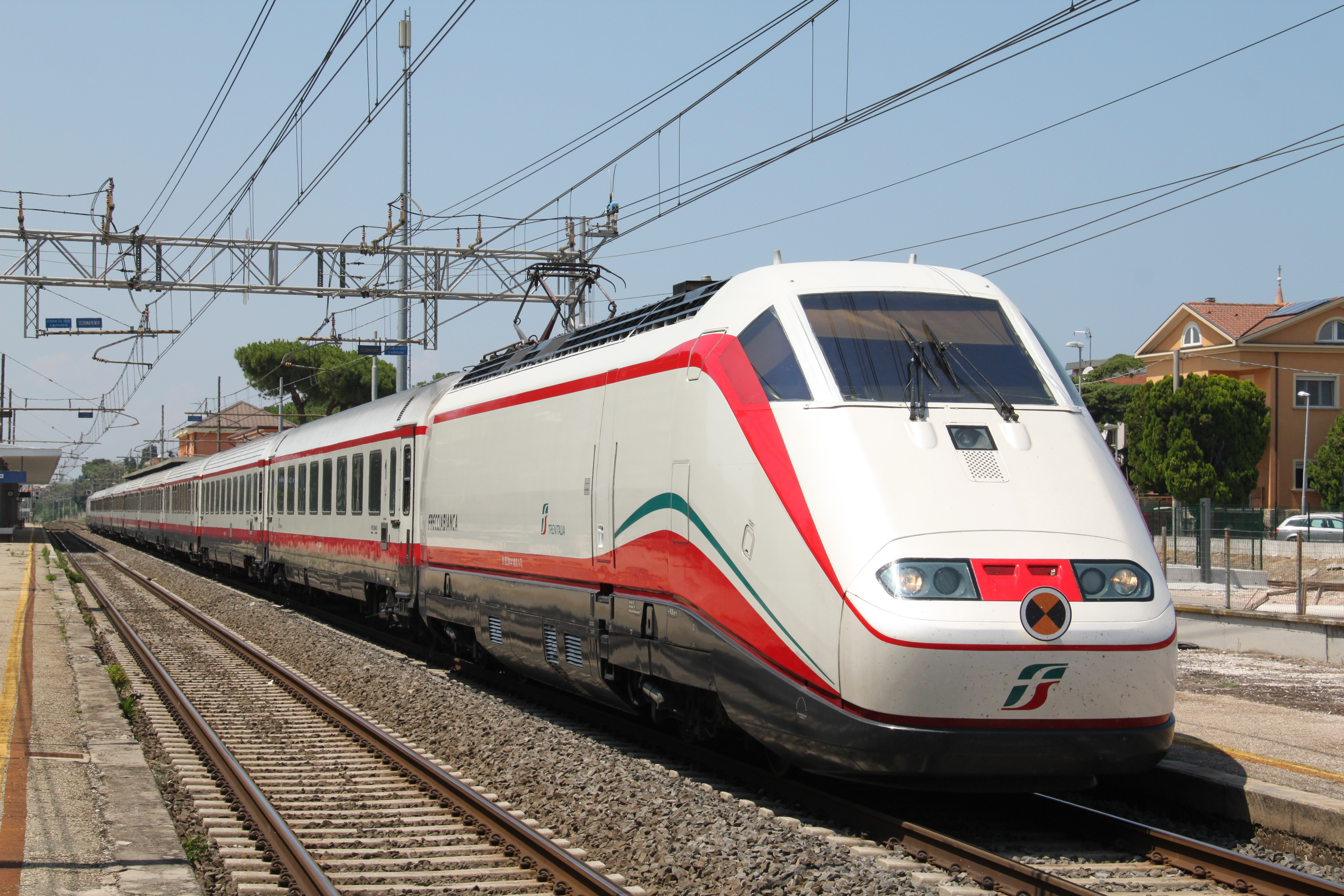
A former Frecciabianca E.414

=== Current ===
- FS Class ETR 460: electric 9-car trainsets in two-class layout, maximum speed of 250 km/h (155 mph) limited to 200 km/h (124 mph)

=== Historic ===
Formerly, additional rolling stock was used under the Frecciabianca banner. While most of the following trainsets and coaches have been relocated to Trenitalia's own InterCity brand since, the ETR 470 are now operated by Hellenic Train in Greece.

- FS Class E.414 - until June 2020
- FS Class ETR 470 - until December 2020
- FS Class E.402B- until 12 June 2022
- FS Class E.464 - until 12 June 2022
- FS Gran Confort railway coaches - until 12 June 2022
- UIC-Z1 railway coaches - until 12 June 2022

== See also ==
- High-speed rail in Italy
- Eurostar Italia
- Train categories in Europe
