= FS Class ETR 460 =

Italian electric tilting train

ETR 460
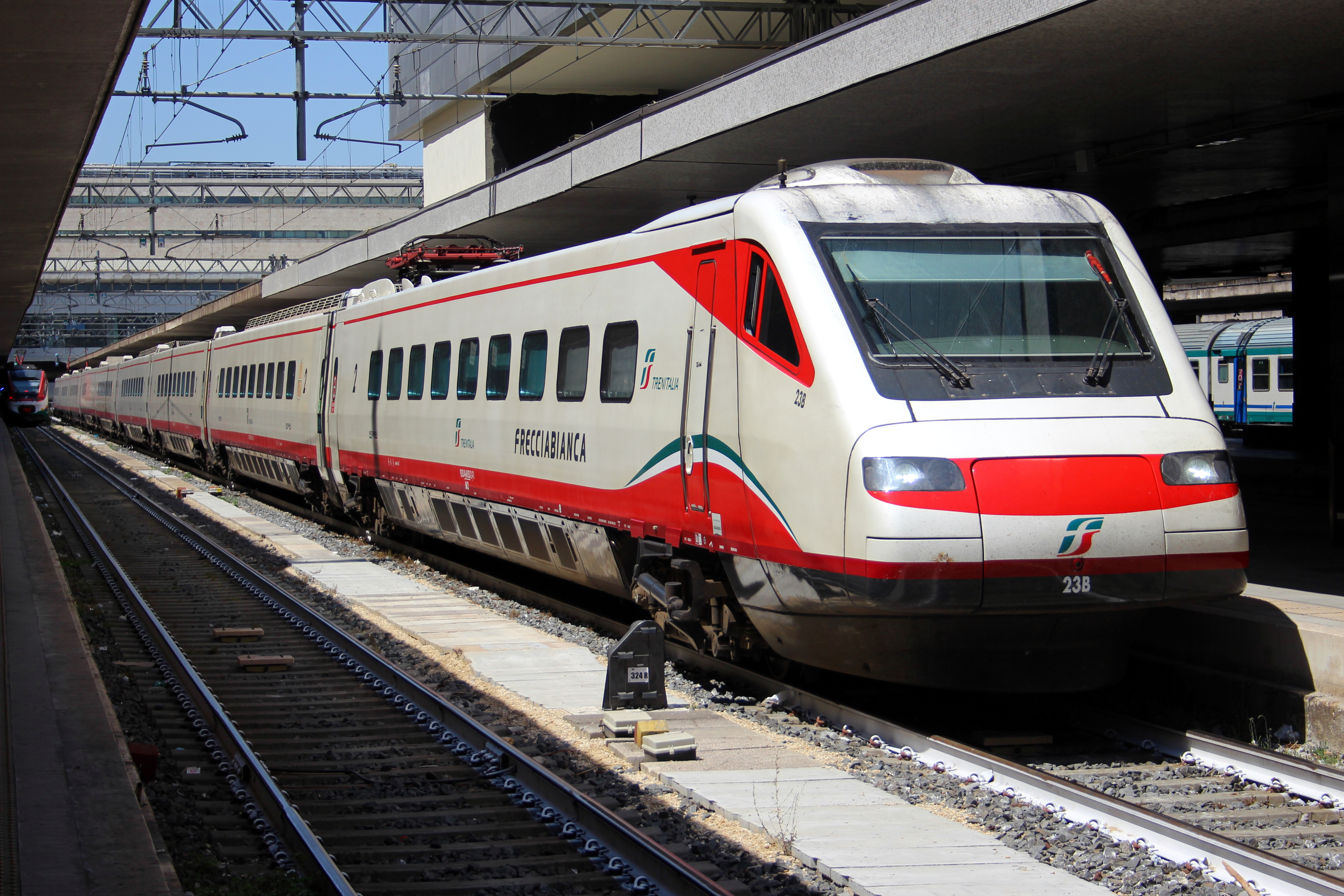
- An ETR460 in the Frecciabianca livery
- In service: 1994–2026
- Manufacturer: FIAT Ferroviaria
- Designer: Giorgetto Giugiaro
- Built at: Savigliano ( Provincia di Cuneo )
- Family name: Pendolino
- Constructed: 1993–1995
- Number built: 10 trainsets
- Number in service: 6 trainsets
- Number scrapped: 1 (after accident in Piacenza 12 January 1997), 3 indefinitely set aside
- Formation: 9-car trainset
- Capacity: 480 passengers: 137 1st class, 341 2nd class, 2 for disabled people.
- Operator: Ferrovie dello Stato/Trenitalia

Specifications
- Train length: 236 m (774 ft 3 3/8 in)
- Maximum speed: 250 km/h (155 mph), Limited to 220 km/h (137 mph)
- Weight: 440 t (430 long tons; 490 short tons)
- Axle load: 13.5 t (13.3 long tons; 14.9 short tons)
- Power output: 5,880 kW (7,890 hp)
- Electric systems: 3,000 V DC Overhead catenary
- Current collection: Pantograph
- Track gauge: 1,435 mm (4 ft 8 1/2 in) standard gauge

The ETR 460 is an electric multiple unit (EMU) tilting train produced by FIAT Ferroviaria (now Alstom Ferroviaria) since 1993. It is also known as the Pendolino after the family of trains from which it comes.

The ETR 460 is a development of the ETR 450, a Pendolino EMU developed in the 1970s, being characterized by improved layout, electrical and electronic systems, and improved comfort. Maximum speed remains unchanged at 250 km/h (155 mph). The ETR 460 spawned two similar types of Pendolinos: the ETR 470 and the ETR 480. The main difference between the versions is that the 460 runs only on 3 kV DC, the 470 on 3 kV DC and 15 kV AC, and the 480 on 3 kV DC and 25 kV AC (used on new high-speed railways in Italy). Three sets were modified to be capable of additionally running on 1.5 kV DC for use on Milan-Turin-Lyon services, but have been all re-converted to the ETR 460 standard and renamed ETR 463. The British Class 390, the Slovenian series 310, the Portuguese Alfa Pendular, the Finnish Sm3 and the Spanish Alaris series were all derived from the ETR 460.

The trainset, designed by Giorgetto Giugiaro, is used by Trenitalia for their Frecciabianca service on several routes across Italy.

The trainset has the ability to tilt by up to 8° when taking corners so as to reduce the effect of centrifugal force on the passengers. The passengers remain comfortable even if the train fully takes advantage of the characteristics of the track thanks to the lightness of the construction (only 13.5 t or 13.3 long tons or 14.9 short tons / axle). Use of the train does not demand particular modifications to the railroad but it is expensive in terms of maintenance of the rolling stock due to the complexity of the tilting system.

The hydraulic tilting system it is governed by two gyroscopes located in the lead cars. The curve is found on the base of the elevation of the external track.

ETR 460s are provided with 12 three-phase asynchronous motors (compared to the 16 in the ETR 450) located in all cars, in order to improve cornering capability. The motors are controlled by GTO-VVVF inverters, with a total power of some 6 MW. Electric braking is of rheostatic type, with the possibility of energy recovery at some speeds while the mechanical braking system uses disc brakes, commanded by an electro-pneumatic system called Wabcontrol.

ETR 460s can carry up to 480 passengers. Configuration includes two head coaches, 6 intermediate passenger coaches and a bar - restaurant coach.

== See also ==
- ElettroTreno
- Eurostar Italia
- New Pendolino
- Rete Ferroviaria Italiana
- Treno Alta Velocità
- List of high speed trains
