= Eurostar Italia =

Defunct brand of Italian high-speed rail services

Eurostar Italia was the brand name given to high-speed trains operated by Trenitalia in Italy. The brand was discontinued and replaced with Le Frecce in December 2012.

== History ==
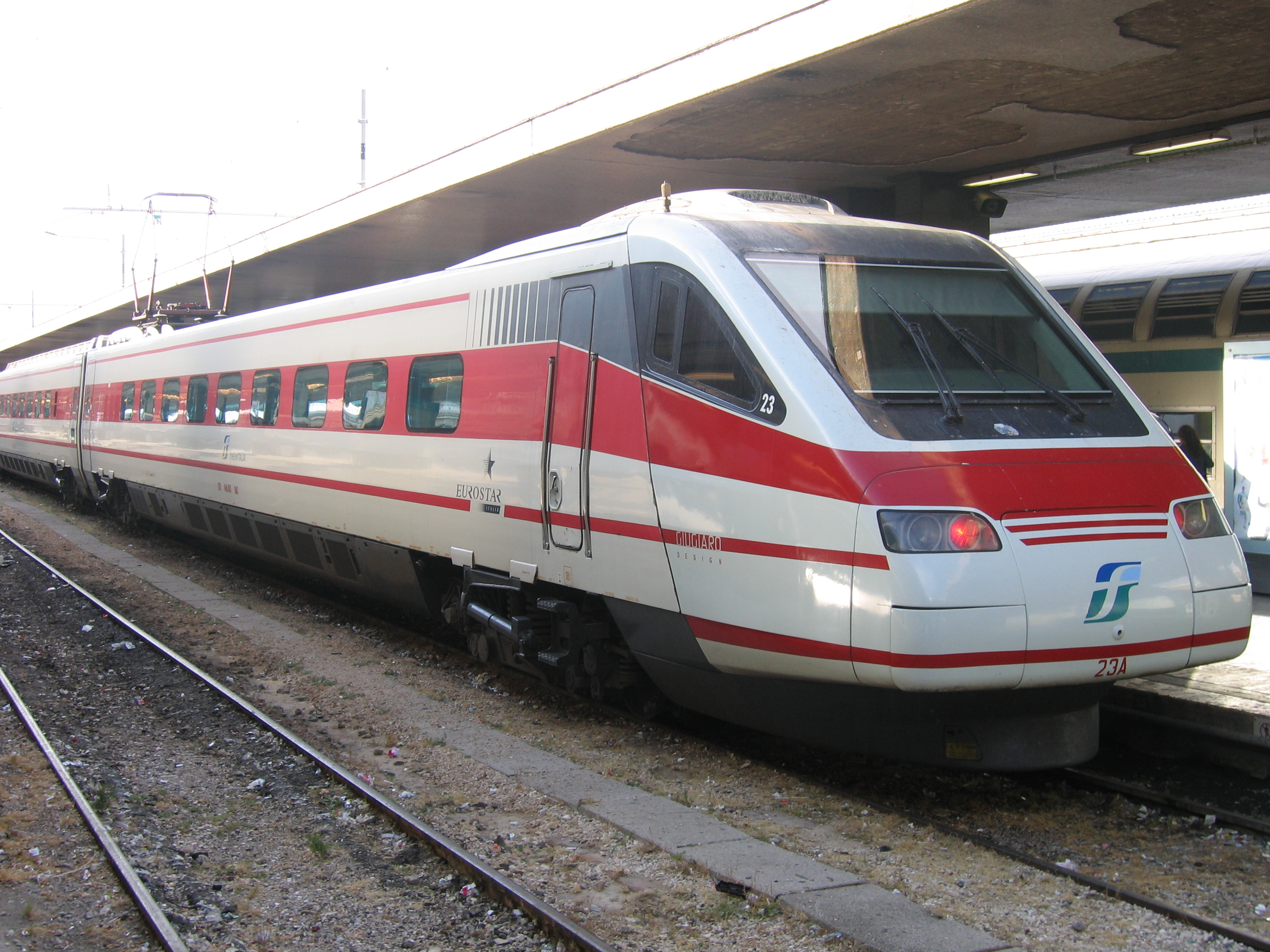
A former FS Class ETR 460 Eurostar Italia trainset (2006).

Eurostar trains, which were launched in 1997 to replace the Pendolino trains, were always for the line from Milan to Rome and its expansions. The Italian state railroad claimed the name "Eurostar" prior to the Eurostar connecting London to Paris.

Since 2006 with the opening of the high speed lines the category gradually declined in several subcategories and the original gradually downsized. In June 2012, the category Eurostar was divided into various subcategories under a new branding, indicating various high-speed services. The new categories created were Frecciarossa for the fastest trains (300 km/h (186 mph)), Frecciargento for the next category of trains (250 km/h (155 mph)), and Frecciabianca (200 km/h (125 mph)). The final Eurostar services connecting Rome with Ravenna and Reggio Calabria operated until December 2012.

The name Eurostar was used under license from Iveco, which owns the trademark and used the name for one of their trucks. Despite the identical name, there is no relation between this service and the Eurostar railway service that runs through the Channel Tunnel.

== Routes ==
Various categories used until June 2012 were:

- Eurostar Alta Velocità Frecciarossa (Turin-Milan-Florence-Rome-Naples), now only Frecciarossa
- Eurostar Alta Velocità Frecciargento (Rome-Venice, Rome-Reggio Calabria, Rome-Lecce), now only Frecciargento
- Eurostar City Italia Frecciabianca, now only Frecciabianca
- Eurostar Italia Business, discontinued after opening high-speed line Milan-Rome
- Eurostar Italia Alta Velocità Fast, now included in Frecciarossa and Frecciargento
- Eurostar Italia Fast, now included in Frecciarossa and Frecciargento

== Rolling stock ==
- FS Class ETR 460

== See also ==
- Treno Alta Velocità
- Trenitalia
- Rete Ferroviaria Italiana
- ElettroTreno
- Pendolino
- New Pendolino
- Train categories in Europe
