= Luigi Corradi =

Italian businessman

- Born: 1966 (age 59–60); Genova, Italy
- Education: University of Genoa; Bocconi University
- Occupations: Businessman; Engineer
- Employer: Trenitalia
- Children: 3

Luigi Corradi (born 1966 in Genova) is an Italian businessman who has been the CEO of Trenitalia since 2020.

== Biography ==
Luigi Corradi holds a mechanical engineering degree from the University of Genoa, and an MBA from the Bocconi University.

He worked at La Spezia Naval Base and Ansaldo Energia. He joined Bombardier Transportation Italy (ABB Daimler Benz Transportation) in 1996 as a locomotive engineer at the Vado Ligure plant where he became a general manager in 2003. In 1998, he worked on Trenitalia's FS Class E.464 locomotives. He took the leadership of Trenitalia's Frecciarossa 1000 train project in 2010. He was appointed CEO of Bombardier Transportation Italy in August 2013. In October 2015, he introduced Bombardier's new Zefiro high-speed train in Italy. In June 2019, he sold Frecciarossa 1000's engineering to the French Segula Technologies. He stepped down in August 2019 and the following month, in September 2019, he was named CEO of Titagar Firema.

In December 2020, he was named CEO of Trenitalia. In May 2022, he was appointed chairman of the CEO Coalition of the Community of European Railway and Infrastructure Companies.

== Honors ==
In December 2022, he was made an honorary citizen of Campi Salentina (birthplace of his maternal grandmother).

== Personal life ==
He is married and has three daughters.
