= FS Class ETR 480 =

Tilting electric train with no locomotive

ETR 480 / ETR 485
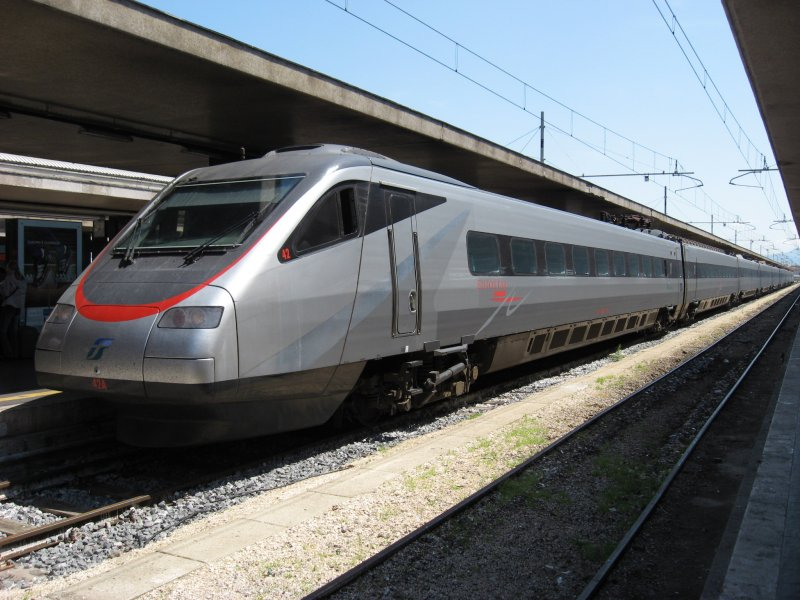
- ETR 480
- In service: 1997-
- Manufacturer: Fiat Ferroviaria / Alstom
- Designer: Giorgetto Giugiaro
- Built at: Savigliano (Cuneo)
- Family name: Pendolino
- Constructed: 1997-1998 (ETR 480)
- Refurbished: 2004-2009 (ETR 485)
- Number under construction: 1 (Rebuilding damaged ETR 485 - 36)
- Number built: 15 trainsets
- Number in service: 14 (ETR 485 - 36 seriously damaged in accident on 24 September 2012, expected to return in service as it is being tested)
- Formation: 9 cars trainset: 3 1st class cars, 1 bar-restaurant car, 5 2nd class cars.
- Capacity: ETR 480: 480 seats - 139 1st class, 341 2nd class; ETR 485: 489 seats -146 1st class, 343 2nd class. 2 wheelchair + 23 restaurant.
- Operators: Trenitalia / Trainose (from 2019)
- Lines served: Italy: Frecciargento services: Napoli C. - Roma Termini - Firenze C. M. - Bologna C. - Verona P. N. - Bolzano / - Brescia, Roma Termini - Firenze C. M. - Pisa C. - La Spezia - Genova P. P., Roma Termini - Caserta - Benevento - Foggia - Bari - Brindisi - Lecce, Roma Termini - Napoli Afragola - Salerno - Paola - Lamezia Terme Centrale - Rosarno - Villa San Giovanni - Reggio Calabria Centrale.

Specifications
- Train length: 236.6 m (776 ft 3 in)
- Maximum speed: 250 km/h (155 mph)
- Weight: 409 t (403 long tons; 451 short tons)
- Power output: 6 MW (8,000 hp)
- Electric system(s): ETR 480: 3 kV DC Overhead catenary; ETR 485: 3 kV DC, 25 kV 50 Hz AC
- Current collection: Pantograph
- Track gauge: 1,435 mm (4 ft 8 1/2 in) standard gauge

The ETR 480 is a tilting Electric Multiple Unit built by Fiat Ferroviaria (now Alstom Ferroviaria) since 1993, It is also known as Pendolino. It was developed from the first new-generation Pendolino, the ETR 460. The main difference between ETR 460, ETR 470 and ETR 480 is that the 460 run only on 3 kV DC, the 470 on both 3 kV DC and 15 kV AC, and the 480 on both 3 kV DC and 25 kV 50 Hz AC.

== FS Class 485 ==
The ETR 480 was originally built without real 25 kV AC electrical equipment. This equipment is now installed on all the sets and the trains that have been converted are then re-measured on ETR 485.

== Export ==
One of these units has been sent for testing on the Greek railway (TrainOSE), on the high speed line between Thessaloniki and Katerini. In August 2018, the specified number of 485,031 was transferred from Italy to Greece for test routes. This was the beginning for converting some ETR 470 for use by TrainOSE.

== Technical information ==
- max. speed (in service): 250 km/h (155 mph)
- traction system: = 3 kV DC, 25 kV 50 Hz AC (all 15 trainsets)
- power: 6 MW (8,000 hp)
- length: 236.6 m (776 ft 3 in)
- mass: 409 t (403 long tons; 451 short tons)
- max axle load: 13.5 t (13.3 long tons; 14.9 short tons)
- max. tilting angle: 8°
- configuration: head coach + 7 middle coaches + head coach
- total number of seats: ETR 480: 480 (341 II + 139 I); ETR 485: 489 (343 II + 146 I)

== See also ==
- ElettroTreno
- Alfa Pendular
- List of high speed trains
- ETR 460
- ETR 470
- New Pendolino
- Renfe Class 104
