= Alstom Ferroviaria =

Former rail division of Fiat of Italy

Alstom Ferroviaria S.p.A.
- Founded: 1880
- Fate: Acquired by Alstom in June 2000, succeeded by Alstom Ferroviaria S.p.A in 2002
- Headquarters: Naples, Italy
- Products: Diesel locomotives Railcars; Buses
- Parent: Alstom

Alstom Ferroviaria S.p.A., formerly known as Fiat Ferroviaria S.p.A., is the Italian division of Alstom. Fiat Ferroviaria S.p.A. was the rail division of automobile manufacturer Fiat. It was founded in 1880 as Società Nazionale Officine di Savigliano. Fiat Ferroviaria began building locomotives in the 1930s. It became part of Fiat in 1970. Fiat Ferroviaria acquired the rail business of SIG of Switzerland in 1995, forming the subsidiary Fiat-Sig.

The company had previously owned Argentine company Materfer until 1998, which now operates as an independent company. In June 2000, Alstom purchased a 51% shareholding.

== Overview ==
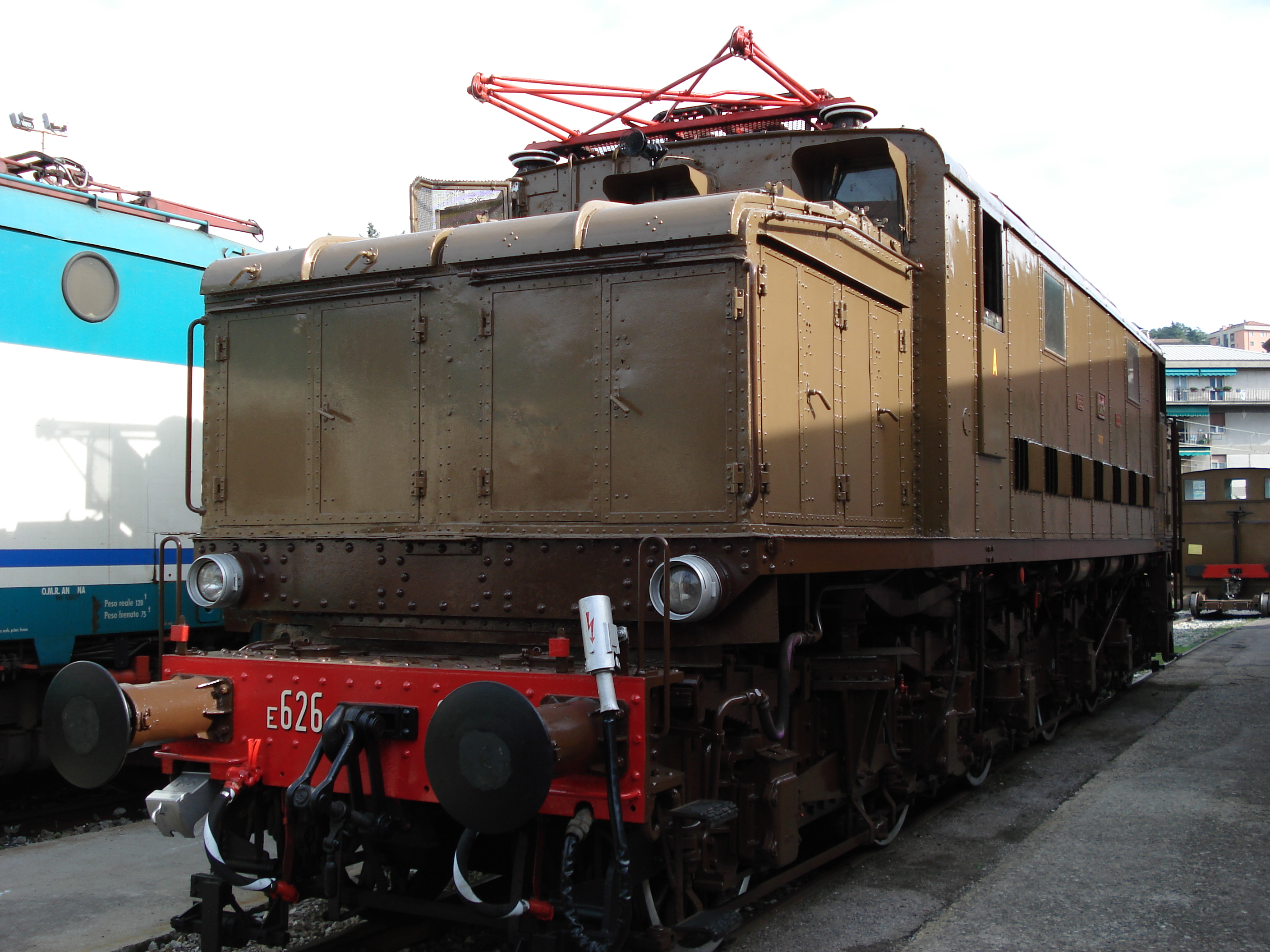
FS Class E626 locomotive, a mainstay of Italian railways starting from the 1930s

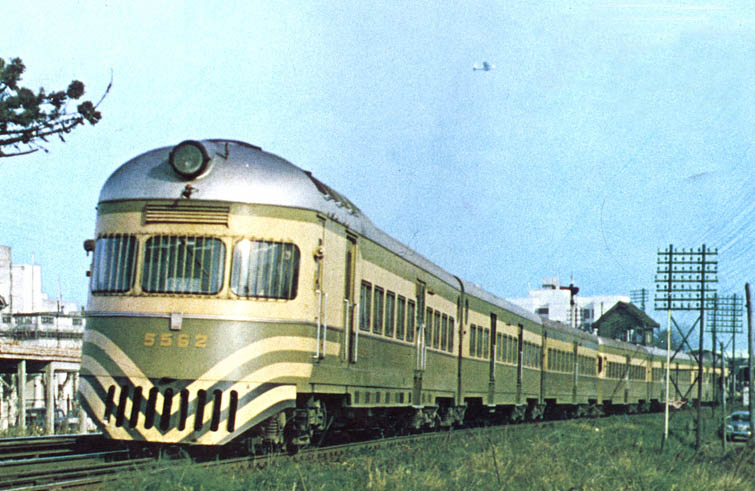
The first model of 7131 railcar for the Argentine railways.

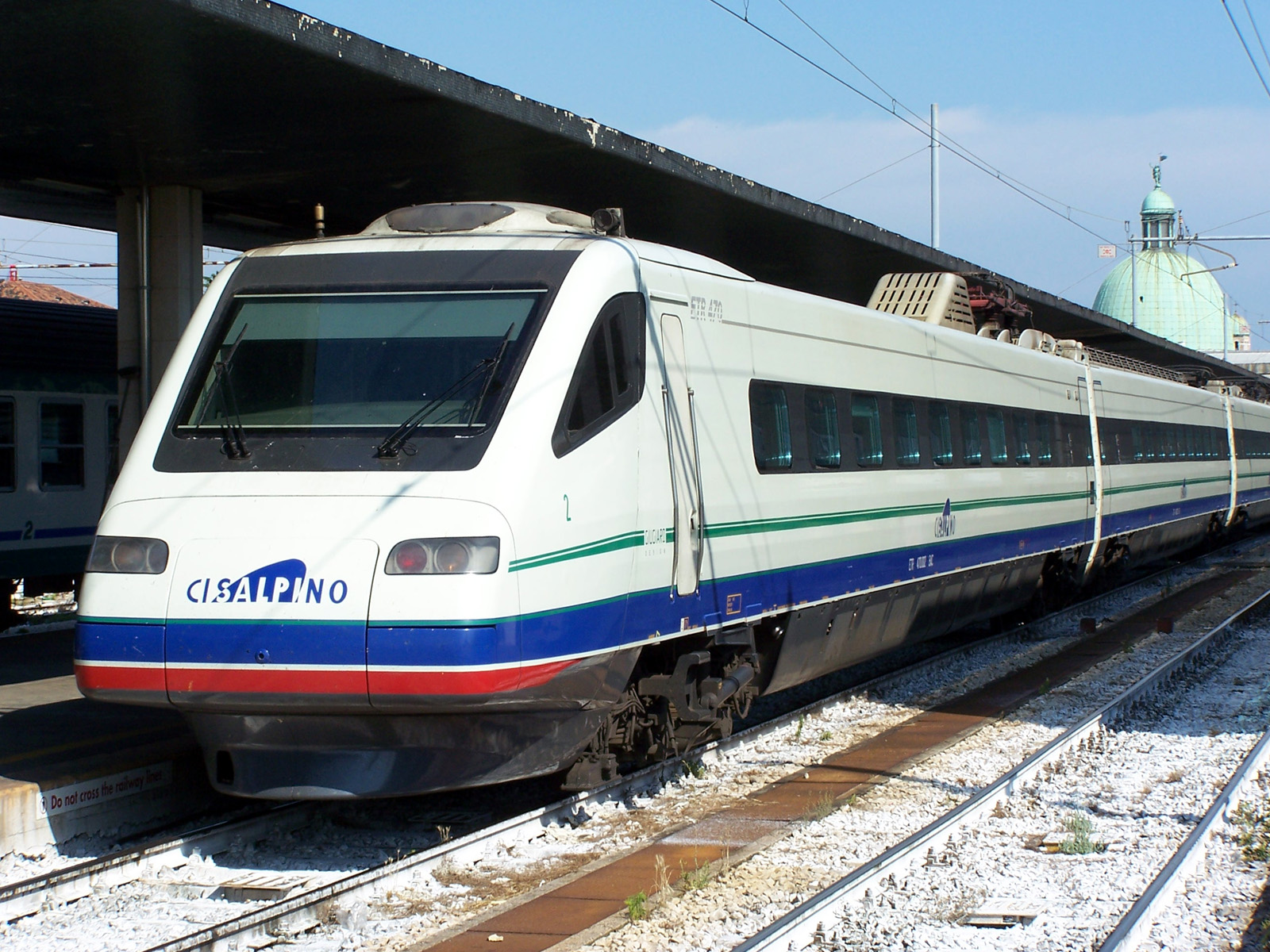
Cisalpino Pendolino (2008)

During the 1960s and 1970s, Fiat Ferroviaria developed a tilting technology for trains and was the first (and the only one for several decades) to produce active tilting trains with the trademark of Pendolino. In Italy, several classes of Pendolinos were adopted starting from 1976 (ETR 401, ETR 450, ETR 460-65, ETR 480-85 and the Alstom made ETR600.

Following the success of the ETR 450 series introduced in Italy in 1988 (the 401 series introduced in 1976 consisted of only 2 trainsets and never operated regular commercial service, working more like an "on-wheel laboratory"), tilting systems including bogies, traction, electric and electronic equipment were ordered by several countries:

- Germany (ICE T)
- Finland (VR Class Sm3 and VR Class Sm6)
- Switzerland (Cisalpino)
- Spain (Alaris)
- Portugal (Alfa Pendular)
- Slovenia (SŽ series 310)
- Czech Republic (ČD Class 680)

In February 1999, Virgin Trains West Coast ordered a fleet of Class 390s from Alstom that incorporated Fiat Ferroviaria tilting technology.

Directly or indirectly, 18 countries throughout the world applied the Italian Fiat Ferroviaria tilting technology to their trains, including the United States and China.

== See also ==
- Pendolino and New Pendolino, families of tilting trains, built by Fiat Ferroviaria
- Materfer, Argentine factory of licensed Fiat rolling stock
- Fiat Materfer 7131, railcars built by the company for Argentine urban services
