= Treno Alta Velocità =

Company tasked with planning and construction of Italy's high-speed rail network

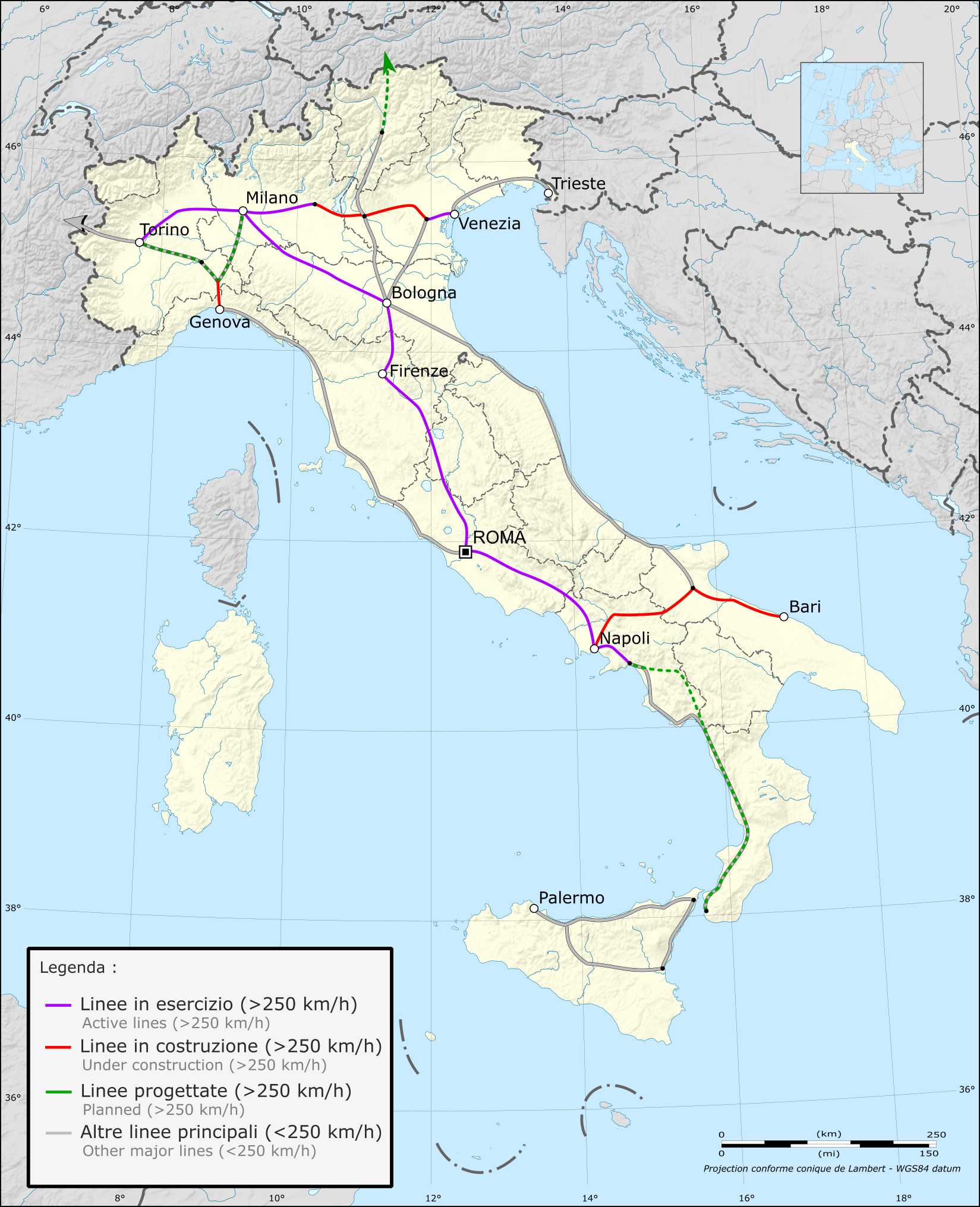
Treno Alta Velocità network

Treno Alta Velocità SpA (TAV) was a special-purpose entity owned by Rete Ferroviaria Italiana (itself owned by Ferrovie dello Stato Italiane) for the planning and construction of a high-speed rail network in Italy.

== Purpose ==
The purpose of Treno Alta Velocità is the construction of dedicated high speed rail corridors where conventional lines are already saturated. First focus was the Milan to Salerno and the Turin to Trieste corridors. The aims of the project include: aligning the operations of the Italian rail network to European rail standards; expanding the availability of high-speed rail throughout the country thus improving travel times between Italy's major cities; substantially increasing line capacities and train frequencies, and enhancing safety through updates in train control and signaling. Italy's new high speed lines will be used principally for passenger services during the day (AV – Alta Velocità, High-speed) and for freight (AC – Alta Capacità, High-capacity) during the night. The other aim is to desaturate conventional lines, which can be then used for regional transport and commuter services.

== See also ==
- Ferrovie dello Stato Italiane
- High-speed rail in Italy
- Rail transport in Italy
