= Palatino Express =

External image
- Palatino Express sleeper car in TEN livery in the 1980s

The Palatino Express or Rome Express is a historic express train operating between Paris, France, and Rome, Italy, since 1890. Under the name Rome Express the pre-war service operated daily until interrupted by the Second World War. The British film Rome Express (1932) derived its title and its setting from the train. The service was resumed after the war, and has operated with the name Palatino Express since 1969.

== Route ==
The original Rome Express route operated from Calais-Maritime, a coastal railway station providing a direct connection between cross-channel ferries from England and the French railway network, via Paris, Aix-les-Bains, Modane, Turin, Genoa, Pisa, and Florence to Rome. On 21 January 1893 the route was changed to run via Marseilles, Nice, San Remo and Genoa, instead of via Mont Cenis and Turin. In 1897 the route reverted to Mont Cenis.

Following the name change to Palatino Express the service operated the same route, but without the Calais to Paris section. Travellers were still able to make the full journey, by using the Flèche d'Or express service from Calais-Maritime to Paris, until this service was withdrawn in 1972; and thereafter by using a regular service train from Calais-Maritime to Paris, until Calais-Maritime station was closed in the mid-1990s as a result of the opening of the Channel Tunnel. Even then, it remained possible to connect from the ferry port by bus to Calais's main railway station Calais-Ville - or alternatively, thanks to the opening of the Channel Tunnel, to take a Eurostar train directly from the UK to the newly-opened Calais-Frethun - and from there to take a service train to Paris.

Card from the Palatino circa 1984.

== History ==
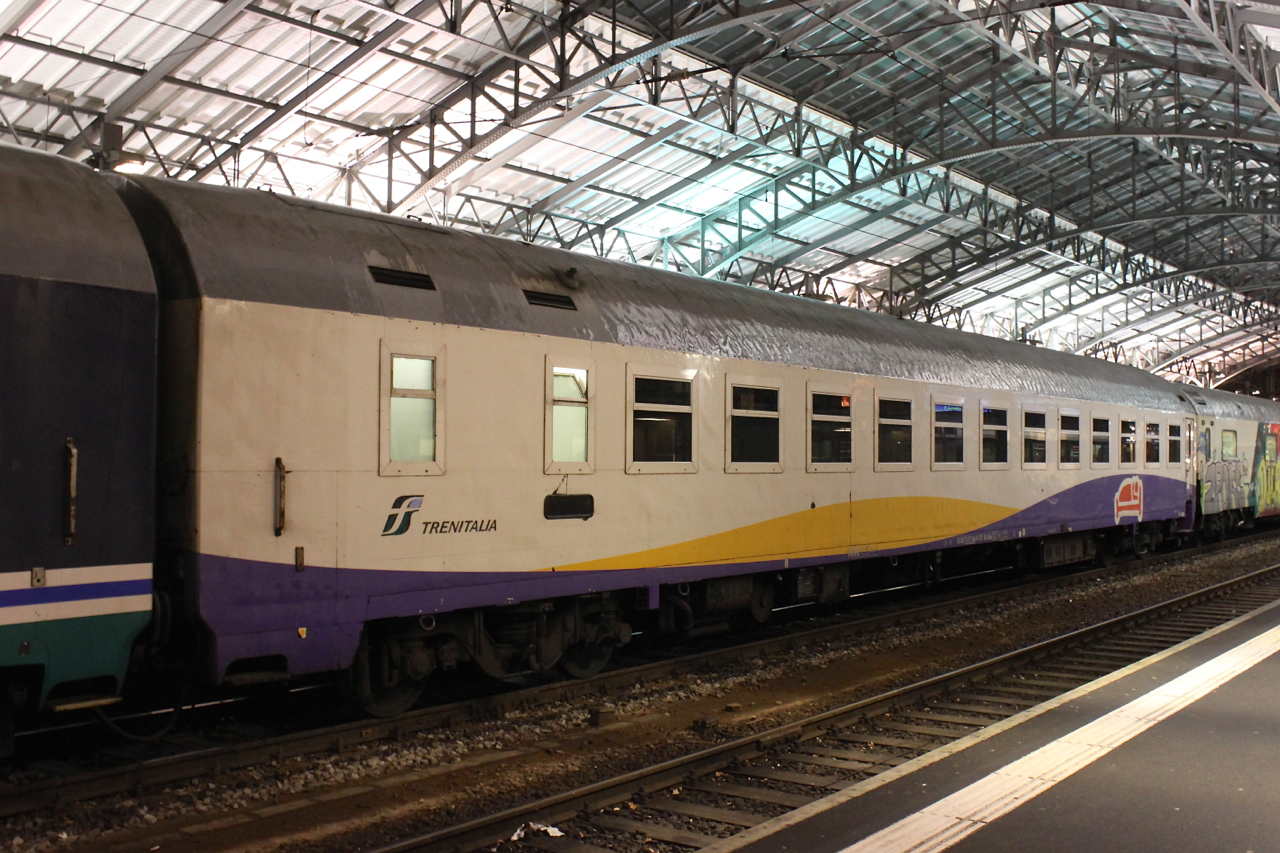
Italian sleeping car wearing Artesia livery at Lausanne.

The Rome Express was a service provided by the Compagnie Internationale des Wagons-Lits. On 24 March 1936, three people were killed and 20 injured when the Rome Express was derailed just beyond Florence. On 18 October 1937, the train collided with a goods train at Arcola when it was diverted onto a siding in error. A platelayer was killed and several passengers were injured. On 11 February 1940, five people were killed and 24 seriously injured when the Rome Express derailed near Pisa.

The post-war resumption (from 1952) was a joint operation by the French and Italian national rail operators (who provided the locomotives and the train diagram) and the Compagnie Internationale des Wagons-Lits who provided the carriages and staff. The name was changed from Rome Express to Palatino Express in 1969. In 1971 the Wagons-Lit Company gave up operating its own coaches, although it continued to provide the staff and ancillary services (such as laundry) for sleeper coaches operated by the national rail companies. The various European rail operators formed a joint operation known as TEN (Trans Euro Night, or the equivalent translation in other languages, such as Trans Euro Nuit (French), Trans Euro Notte (Italian), Trans Euro Nacht (German), and so on). The Palatino Express was marketed as a TEN service from the 1970s through to 1995. On the formation of the Artesia railway company in 1995, the Palatino Express became one of the new venture's key routes. Artesia was a joint venture by SNCF and Trenitalia. Artesia broke up in November 2011 owing to realignment of shared operating procedures between European rail companies. The Palatino Express became a victim of these changing circumstances, and was discontinued on 10 December 2011. The service was briefly revived from December 2012 but was once more withdrawn from 15 December 2013 due to infrastructure problems.

== 2012 revival ==
The train operator Thello acquired the passenger coaches previously used on the Palatino Express, and from 11 December 2011 used these vehicles to operate the daily sleeper service between Paris and Venice, Italy. Early in 2012 Thello also indicated that they wished to resume a regular daily sleeper service between Paris and Rome from the end of that year. On 5 December 2012 Thello issued a press release stating that they were resuming the provision of the Palatino Express service. The company's statement said:

On 9 December 2012, the legendary Palatino Express train will rise from the ashes and once again connect Paris and Rome. The public was looking forward to the reintroduction of this train, subject of much comment on social media, that will restore the link between Paris, Florence and Rome, with intermediate stops at Dijon and Bologna.

The service was withdrawn in December 2013.

== Breaks in service ==
The Rome Express did not operate during the Second World War, and was resumed in 1952. As the "Palatino Express" it had a second break in service from December 2011 to December 2012. Some commentators felt that standards of service declined in the years leading up to the December 2011 withdrawal of the service. As with other European routes originating in France, the development of SNCF's high speed rail network and TGV trains also reduced the demand for traditional overnight sleeper services. The breakup of the operating company Artesia on top of other factors, led to the demise of the service in December 2011, but continued interest from passengers and discussion on social media led to the short lived re-introduction of the train in 2012.

== See also ==
- List of named passenger trains of Europe
- Milan–Paris Frecciarossa
