= Frecciarossa =

Italian high-speed train

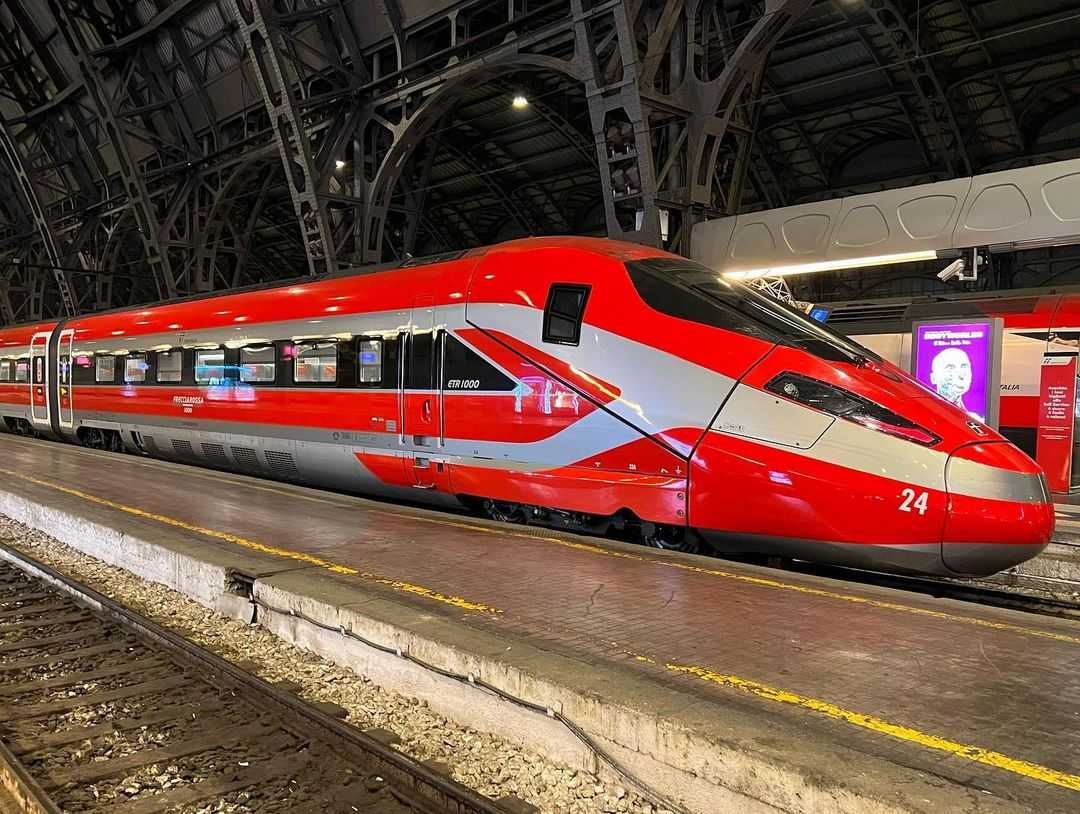
- Frecciarossa 1000 trainset at Milano Centrale

Specifications
- Maximum speed: 300 km/h (190 mph)

Frecciarossa (Italian: [ˌfrettʃaˈrossa]; from freccia rossa, "red arrow") is a high-speed train of the Italian national train operator, Trenitalia, as well as a member of the train category Le Frecce. The name was introduced in 2008 after it had previously been known as Eurostar Italia. Frecciarossa trains operate at speeds of up to 300 km/h (190 mph). Frecciarossa is the premier service of Trenitalia and competes with italo, operated by Nuovo Trasporto Viaggiatori. Trenitalia also operates the sister brands Frecciargento and Frecciabianca for slower services.

== Routes ==
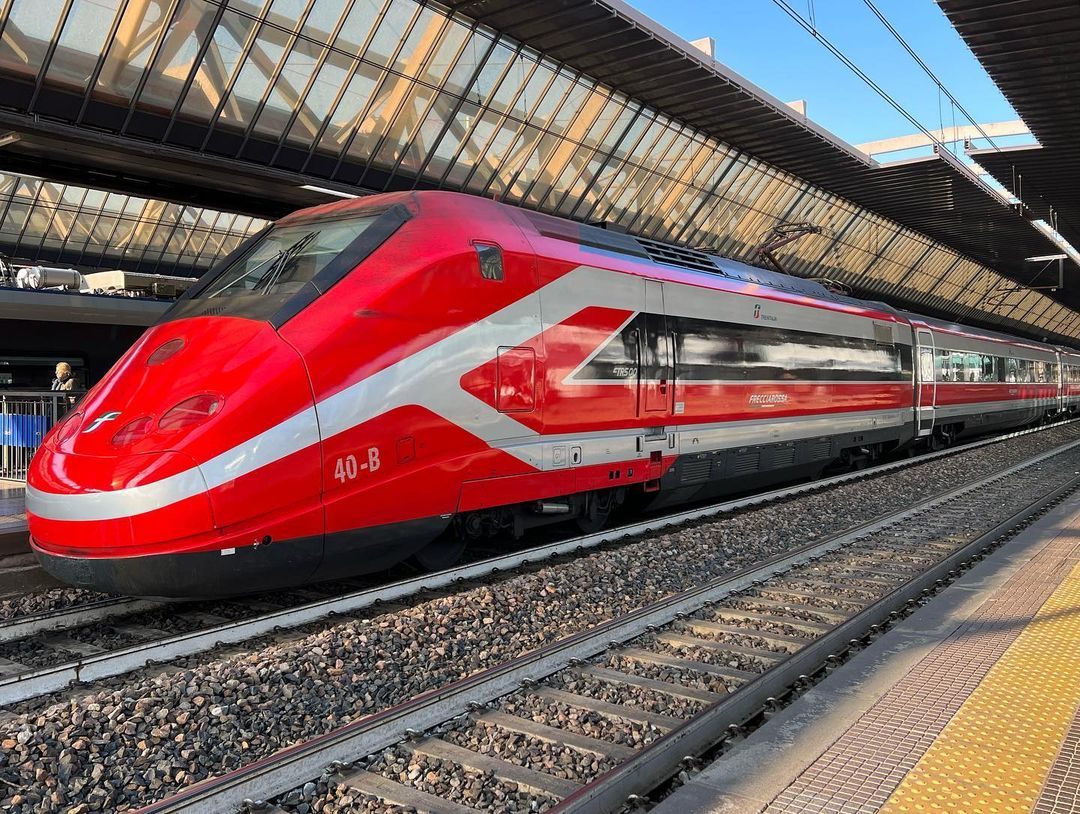
ETR 500 as Frecciarossa at Milano Rogoredo

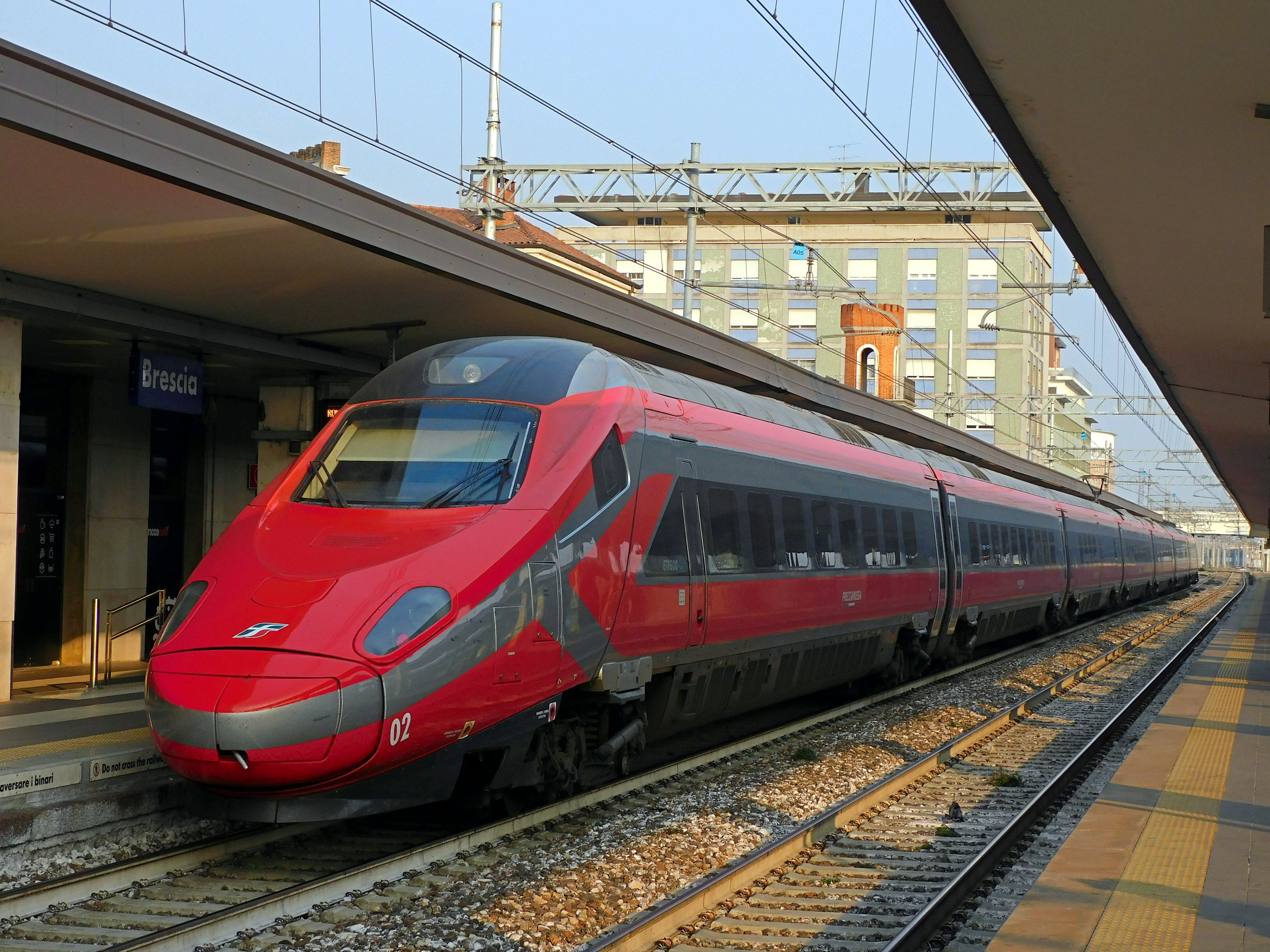
ETR 600 as Frecciarossa at Brescia

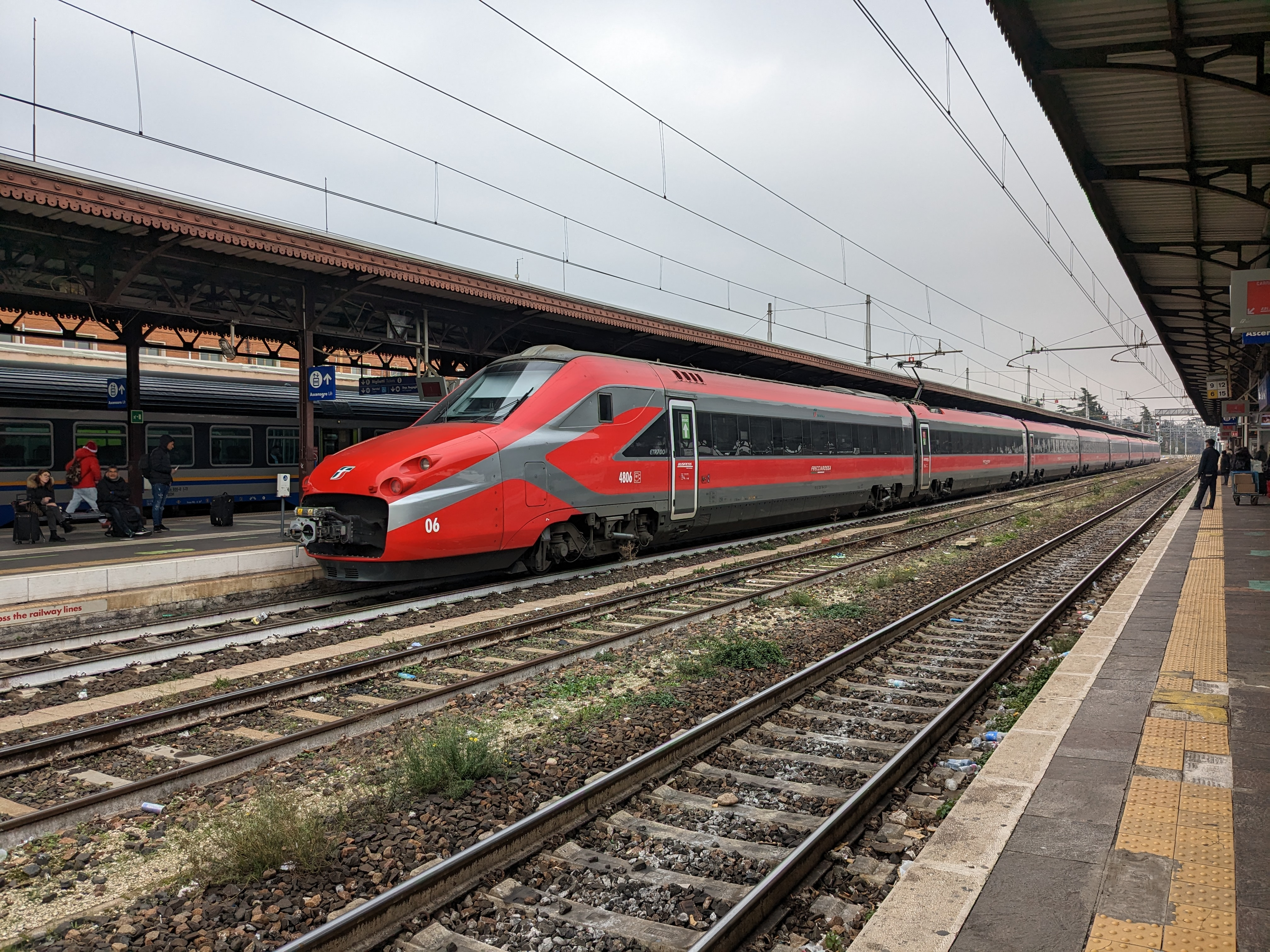
ETR 700 as Frecciarossa at Verona Porta Nuova

Frecciarossa trains travel on dedicated high-speed railway lines and, on some routes, also on conventional railway lines with lower speed limits. Current limitations on the tracks set the maximum operating speed of both types of trains to 300 km/h (190 mph). Frecciarossa trains operate the following services:

- Turin - Milan - Reggio Emilia AV - Bologna - Florence - Rome - Naples - Salerno
- Turin - Milan - Brescia - Verona - Vicenza - Padua - Venice - Monfalcone - Trieste
- Venice - Padua - Bologna - Florence - Rome - Naples - Salerno
- Bergamo - Brescia - Verona - Bologna - Florence - Rome
- Udine - Pordenone - Treviso - Venice - Padua - Vicenza - Verona - Brescia - Milan
- Milan - Reggio Emilia AV - Bologna - Rimini - Ancona - S. Benedetto T. - Pescara - Termoli - Foggia - Bari - Brindisi - Lecce
- Milan - Bologna - Florence - Rome - Naples - Salerno - Potenza - Ferrandina - Metaponto - Taranto
- Venice - Padua - Vicenza - Verona - Brescia - Milan - Pavia - Genoa
- Venice - Padua - Ferrara - Bologna - Florence - Rome - Naples - Salerno
- Perugia - Arezzo - Florence - Bologna - Reggio Emilia AV - Milan - Turin
- Milan - Reggio Emilia AV - Bologna - Florence - Rome - Naples - Salerno - Agropoli - Sapri
- Milan - Reggio Emilia EV - Bologna - Florence - Paola - Lamezia - Rosarno - Villa San Giovanni - Reggio Calabria

The brand also includes the Trenitalia France, which operates three routes:

- Milan – Turin – Bardonecchia (seasonal) – Modane – St. Jean de Maurienne – Chambéry-Challes-les-Eaux – Lyon-Part-Dieu – Paris Gare de Lyon (Milan–Paris Frecciarossa)
- Lyon-Perrache – Lyon-Part-Dieu – Paris Gare de Lyon
- Marseille St. Charles – Aix en Provence – Avignon – Lyon Saint-Exupery – Paris Gare de Lyon

== Rolling stock ==
The following rolling stock types are used for Frecciarossa services:

- ETR.500: non-tilting train made of eleven passenger coaches (one with cafe/restaurant service) with 574 seats moved by two E.404 locomotives, speeds up to 300 km/h (190 mph).
- ETR.600: tilting train made of seven passenger coaches (one with cafe/restaurant service) with 432 seats, speeds up to 250 km/h (155 mph).
- ETR.700: non-tilting train made of 8 passenger coaches (one with cafe/restaurant service) with 497 seats, speeds up to 250 km/h (155 mph).
- ETR.1000: non-tilting electro-train made of eight passenger coaches (one with cafe/restaurant service) with 457 seats, speeds up to 400 km/h (250 mph).

== Accidents and incidents ==
- On 6 February 2020, a Frecciarossa train derailed at Ospedaletto Lodigiano, killing two people and injuring 27 others.
- On 10 December 2023, a Frecciarossa train collided with another passenger train at Faenza injuring 17.
- On 18 January 2026, a Frecciarossa ETR 1000 train operated by Iryo derailed and collided with an Alvia Class 120 train in Adamuz, causing 46 deaths across both trains.
- On 28 October 2026, an ETR 1000 operated by Iryo collided with an Renfe class 103 on the same line in Toledo, Spain. 46+ people died with 168+ people injured.

== See also ==
- Eurostar Italia
- High-speed rail in Italy
- Rail transport in Italy
- Train categories in Europe
