= Trenitalia =

Italian railway company

- Type: State-owned enterprise
- Industry: Rail transport
- Founded: 2000
- Headquarters: Rome, Italy
- Key people: Tommaso Tanzilli (chairman); Stefano Antonio Donnarumma (CEO and general manager)
- Products: Transport
- Revenue: ▲€13.7 billion (2022)
- Net income: ▲€202 million (2022)
- Owner: Ferrovie dello Stato Italiane
- Number of employees: ▲85,361 (2022)
- Website: www.trenitalia.com

Trenitalia SpA is the primary train operator of Italy, which was established in 2000. A subsidiary of Ferrovie dello Stato Italiane, itself owned by the Italian government, it was established following a European Union directive on the deregulation of rail transport. The company operates both regional and long-distance trains. It also operates or operated in the past through ownerships or subsidiary companies in France, Spain, and the United Kingdom. Among the company's high-speed train are Frecciarossa, Frecciargento, Frecciabianca, InterCity, and InterCity Notte. In 2024, Trenitalia was recognized as the best rail passenger operator in Europe.

== History ==
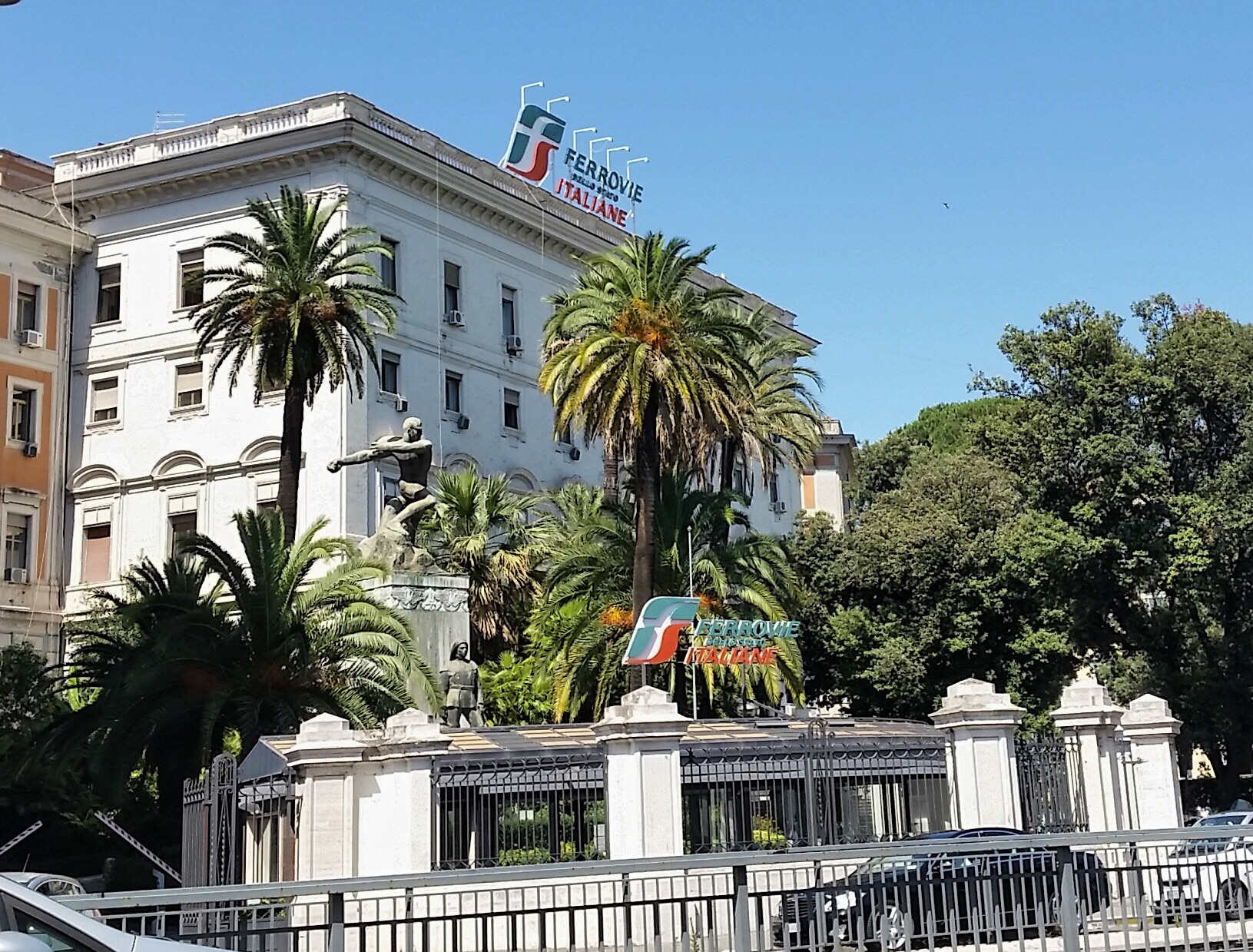
Headquarters of Ferrovie dello Stato Italiane in Rome

The Italian government formed Trenitalia as a società per azioni (SpA) to comply with European Union regulations. The European Commission's First Railway Directive from 1991 (91/440/EC) required separation of accounting between entities which manage the rail infrastructure and entities which provide the actual rail transportation. On the 1st of June 2000, Italy created Trenitalia as the primary rail transportation company, and on 1 July 2001 established Rete Ferroviaria Italiana (RFI) as the company overseeing the rail network; however, the separation was only formal since both are subsidiaries of the Ferrovie dello Stato Italiane holding and are owned wholly by the government. Trenitalia operated freight rail services under the Trenitalia Cargo brand until 2017, when Mercitalia took over state-owned freight rail and logistics operations.

In early 2012, Trenitalia released a web advertisement to promote its change from two classes of train compartments into four classes. Passengers travelling by the fourth class were not permitted to use the on-board cafeteria or enter the carriages reserved for the other three classes. This change alone reportedly caused controversy, and more controversy followed with the release of the accompanying web advertisement. The web advertisement showed only white people seated in the upper three classes, as well as a black family in the fourth. Italian online media observed this and branded the advertisement as "grotesque". Other complaints of racial discrimination followed in British newspapers, social media, and online. Trenitalia withdrew the web commercial and quickly substituted it following the allegations of racism. Since 13 January 2012, the cafeteria is accessible also for passengers of lower classes. As of July 2014, Adria Ferries has a partnership with Trenitalia wherein tickets can be booked at any train station for onward journey to Durrës, at a steeply discounted price with respect to both tickets separately purchased. This is for connections either in Ancona or in Trieste, and continues the historical link between the Via Appia Traiana and the Via Egnatia.

In December 2024, Trenitalia was recognized as the best European rail passenger for the year, with a score of 7.7 out of a 10-point scale. In a 2024 comparative study by the European umbrella organisation Transport & Environment (T&E), Trenitalia achieved the best result of 27 companies. The criteria were reliability, booking, amenities on board, and taking bikes on medium and long-distance connections.

== Passenger transport ==
Trenitalia offers national rail transport in Italy and international connections to Austria, France, Germany, and Switzerland.

=== Regional trains ===
Regional trains travel within an Italian region or between neighbouring Italian regions, and are subsidized by local government at the regional level by "Contratto di servizio". Regional trains stop at more stations than other long-distance trains, and some stop at all stations. Regionale veloce (fast regional train) are trains stopping at about half of the stations. There are no discount schemes available for non-residents of Italy on regional trains. There are no reservations for regional trains, and for this reason there is no price advantage to acquiring regional tickets in advance online. Once bought, tickets for regional trains have to be validated at the station before departure. "Validation" in this case means placing a date/time stamp on the ticket by inserting it into a (usually) green and white machine either in the station or along the track. This is because regional tickets are not for a particular date or time but are valid for a period (two months for tickets bought before 1 August 2016). The date/time stamp is to show that the ticket cannot be reused. From 1 August 2016, tickets are valid for the 24 hours chosen by online buyers; the date of use can be changed until the previous 24 hours of the later date. The date of use can be anticipated until the 24 hours following this adjusting operation. The omission about the period of use at paper shops will involve a one-way daily ticket issue. This change aims to hinder fare evasion.

=== Long-distance trains and high-speed trains ===
Trenitalia's long-distance trains are mainly of two types, the high-speed Frecce ("Arrows") trainsets and the semi-fast classic InterCity trains with the following brands being used as of 2024:

- Frecciarossa – long distance high-speed services up to 300 km/h
- Frecciargento – long distance high-speed services up to 250 km/h
- Frecciabianca – long distance services up to 200 km/h
- InterCity – long distance services up to 200 km/h using regular coaches
- InterCity Notte – long distance night trains

High-speed rail (managed by RFI) service in Italy commenced in 2008 with about 1,000 km (620 mi) of new track on the Turin-Milan-Bologna-Rome-Naples-Salerno route that allow trains to reach speeds over 360 km/h (220 mph), although current maximum commercial speed is 300 km/h (190 mph). There are currently four generations of ElettroTreno in service on the network. Trenitalia ordered 50 high-speed trainsets in 2010. The new trains are the ETR 1000 series. They are 200 metres (660 ft) long, non-articulated trains, with distributed traction, and capable of up to 400 km/h (250 mph) operation, although current service plans are limited to 360 km/h (220 mph). Mauro Moretti, at the time chief executive of FS group, said FS was considering long-distance international services to France, Germany, or even Spain and the United Kingdom. The trains entered service on the Italian high-speed network in 2015.

=== International passenger services ===
==== Current ====
- Iryo, a high-speed operator in Spain owned by Trenitalia and Air Nostrum, as part of the ILSA consortium. ILSA was selected by ADIF, the company that runs Spanish rail infrastructure, as the first private operator to be granted access to the Spanish rail market. The Trenitalia consortium will run high-speed services on the Madrid-Barcelona, Madrid-Valencia/Alicante and Madrid-Malaga/Seville lines, branded as IRYO. Services will start running in January 2022. The service contract will have a duration of 10 years. The ILSA consortium will offer 32 daily links with a fleet of 23 trains.
- TILO: 50% owned by Trenord (formerly these shares were owned by Trenitalia), 50% owned by the Swiss Federal Railways. The company runs the regional services between Italy and Switzerland. The staff all change at the border and are either FS Trenitalia or SBB CFF FFS. Trenitalia operates all fast trains to/from Switzerland in the Italian portion of the route.
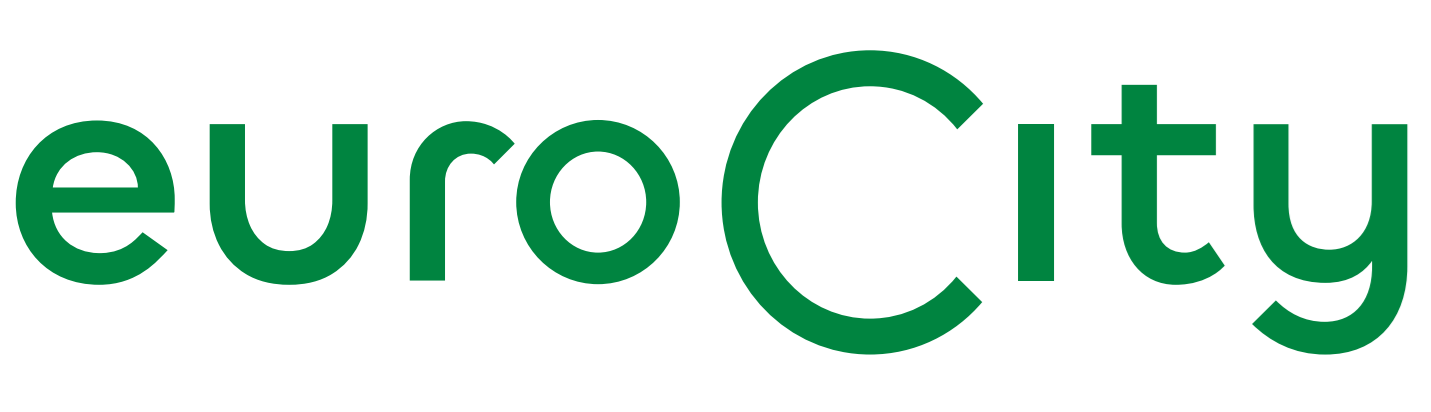
- New branding logo for Trenitalia's refurbished set of new Pendolinos used for Eurocity services between Switzerland and Italy.
  Trenitalia in cooperation with Swiss Federal Railways (SBB CFF FFS) also runs long-distance EuroCity services between Switzerland and Italy on the routes: Geneva–Lausanne–Brig–Domodossola–Milan, Zurich/Basel–Bellinzona–Como–Milan and Basel–Bern–Brig–Milan, with some of these also running further south/east into Italy to Venice for example. Both companies use their own branded versions of Alstom ETR610 New Pendolinos to run these services, along with SBB using SBB RABe 501 (Giruno) trainsets on the Zurich/Basel–Bellinzona–Como–Milan route. One train a day in each direction on the Basel/Zurich–Como–Milan route also runs into Germany serving Freiburg im Breisgau, Ringsheim (for Europa Park), Karlsruhe, Mannheim and Frankfurt.
- Trenitalia France was created in October 2021 by repurposing the former Thello subsidiary. In December 2021, Trenitalia France launched the Milan–Paris Frecciarossa, an open-access service between Paris and Milan, using Frecciarossa 1000 trains. This service was temporarily halted between August 2023 and April 2025 due to a landslide along the route. Two trains a day run from Gare de Lyon and Milano Centrale in each direction with intermediate stops at Lyon Part-Dieu, Chambéry-Challes-les-Eaux, St. Jean de Maurienne and Modane in France, and Oulx-Cesana-Claviere-Sestriere and Torino Porta Susa in Italy.
- Trenitalia also cooperates with Austrian Federal Railways ÖBB to run New Generation Railjet trains from Ancona, Bologna, Verona or Venice to serve: Rovereto, Trento, Bolzano, Bressanone, Fortezza and Brennero/Brennero in Italy; Innsbruck HBF, Jenbach, Wörgl HBF and Kufstein in Austria and Rosenheim, Munich East and Munich Central Station in Germany. There is also an overnight sleeper service using New Generation NightJet rolling stock which serves: Rome Tiburtina, Bologna Centrale, Firenze Santa Maria Novella and Tarvisio Boscoverde in Italy. The train then splits in half at Villach with one half continuing to Schwarzack-St.Veit, Salzburg, Rosenheim and Munich and the other half continuing on to Klagenfurt, Graz, Wiener Neustadt and Vienna, running on the new Koralm tunnel.

==== Former ====
- Artésia was a company jointly owned by Trenitalia and SNCF, operating trains between France and Italy. It ceased operating in November 2011 after SNCF purchased a stake in Nuovo Trasporto Viaggiatori.
- Thello was a private railway service formed as a joint venture with Transdev. In September 2016, Trenitalia bought out Transdev's 33% shareholding. It operated night trains between Paris Gare de Lyon and Venezia Santa Lucia railway station and daytime trains between Milan and Marseille via Genoa and Nice. In 2020, Thello overnight services between Paris and Venice were suspended in March 2020 due to COVID-19 pandemic, with the daytime train cut back to run between Nice and Milan. In June 2021, all services were withdrawn, with Trenitalia announcing a focus on high-speed services between the two countries following the pandemic. The withdrawal was criticised, given the reduction in services between Nice and Milan. Thello was renamed Trenitalia France in October 2021.

=== Operations in the United Kingdom ===
In January 2017, Trenitalia won a bid from the Department for Transport (DfT) to run train operating company c2c from National Express which has a contract to operate the Essex Thameside franchise until November 2029. In the same month it took a 30% stake in a joint venture with FirstGroup, named First Trenitalia, that was later shortlisted to bid for the East Midlands Railway and West Coast Partnership franchises. It was also shortlisted to bid for the South Eastern franchise in its own right. In August 2017, Trenitalia withdrew from the South Eastern contest, citing a desire to concentrate its resources on its bid for the West Coast Partnership. In April 2018, along with FirstGroup, it withdrew from the East Midlands contest citing the same reason. In August 2019, the First Trenitalia consortium was awarded the West Coast Partnership contract. Avanti West Coast ran its first train between London and Manchester on 8 December.

== Tickets ==
Tickets can be bought online, in the stations or from approximately 4,000 travel agencies including those outside Italy. It is common for people to buy tickets from the official website after looking up schedules. Since long-distance trains, unlike regional trains, usually require a reservation, it is advantageous to buy tickets in advance. This also gives buyers access to a variety of discount schemes offered by Trenitalia. All "premium" long-distance trains generally share the same discount schemes, even though their fares may differ. Unlike mini fares, which existed before 2012 and required two days of notice, all tickets may be purchased at the last minute if they are still available. All large rail stations have staffed ticket windows and self-service ticket machines for this purpose. Such machines, which either say "Trenitalia" or "Rete Regionale" ("regional network"), differ in the types of payment accepted.

== Rolling stock ==
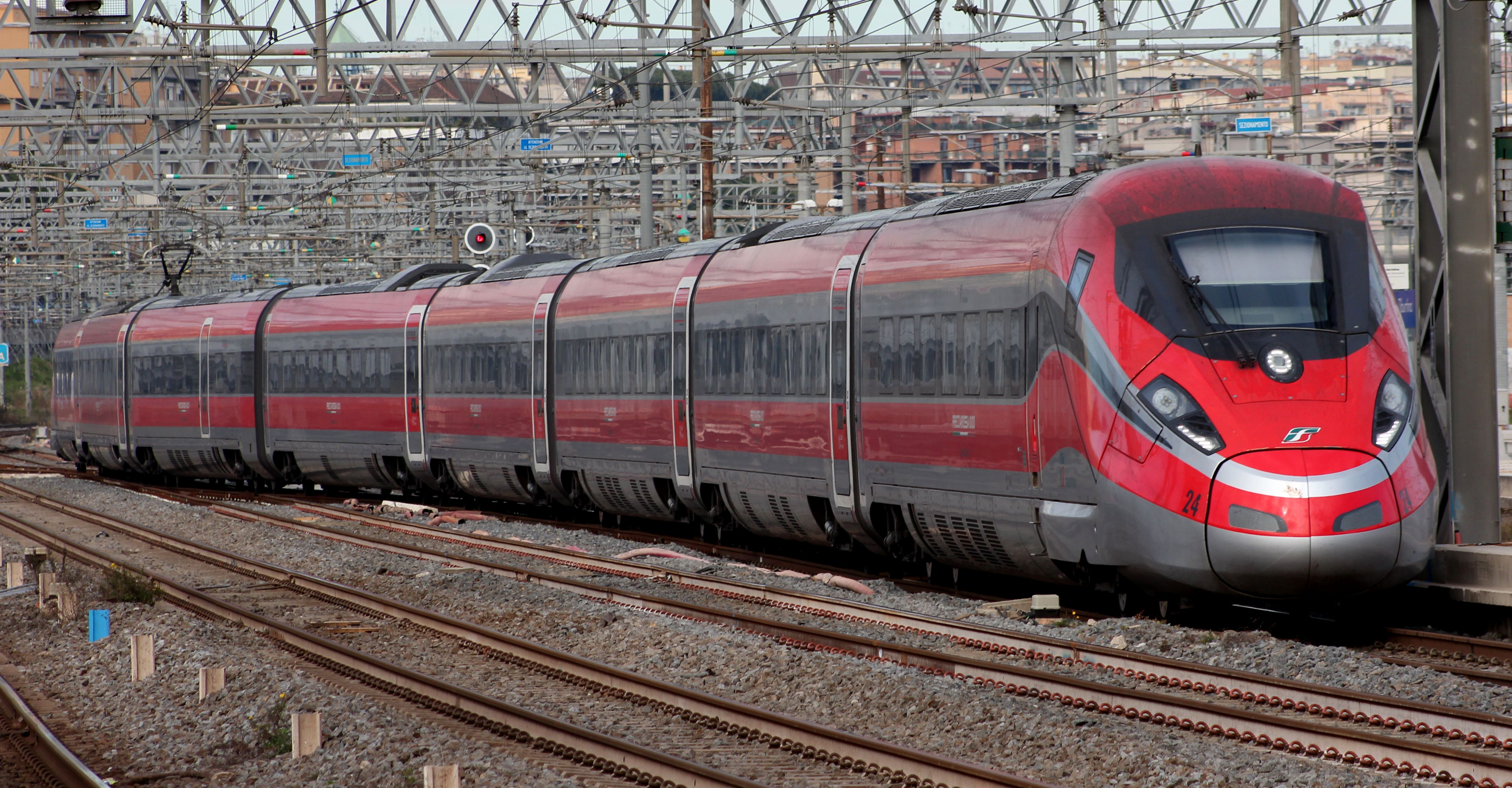
A Frecciarossa 1000 high-speed trainset

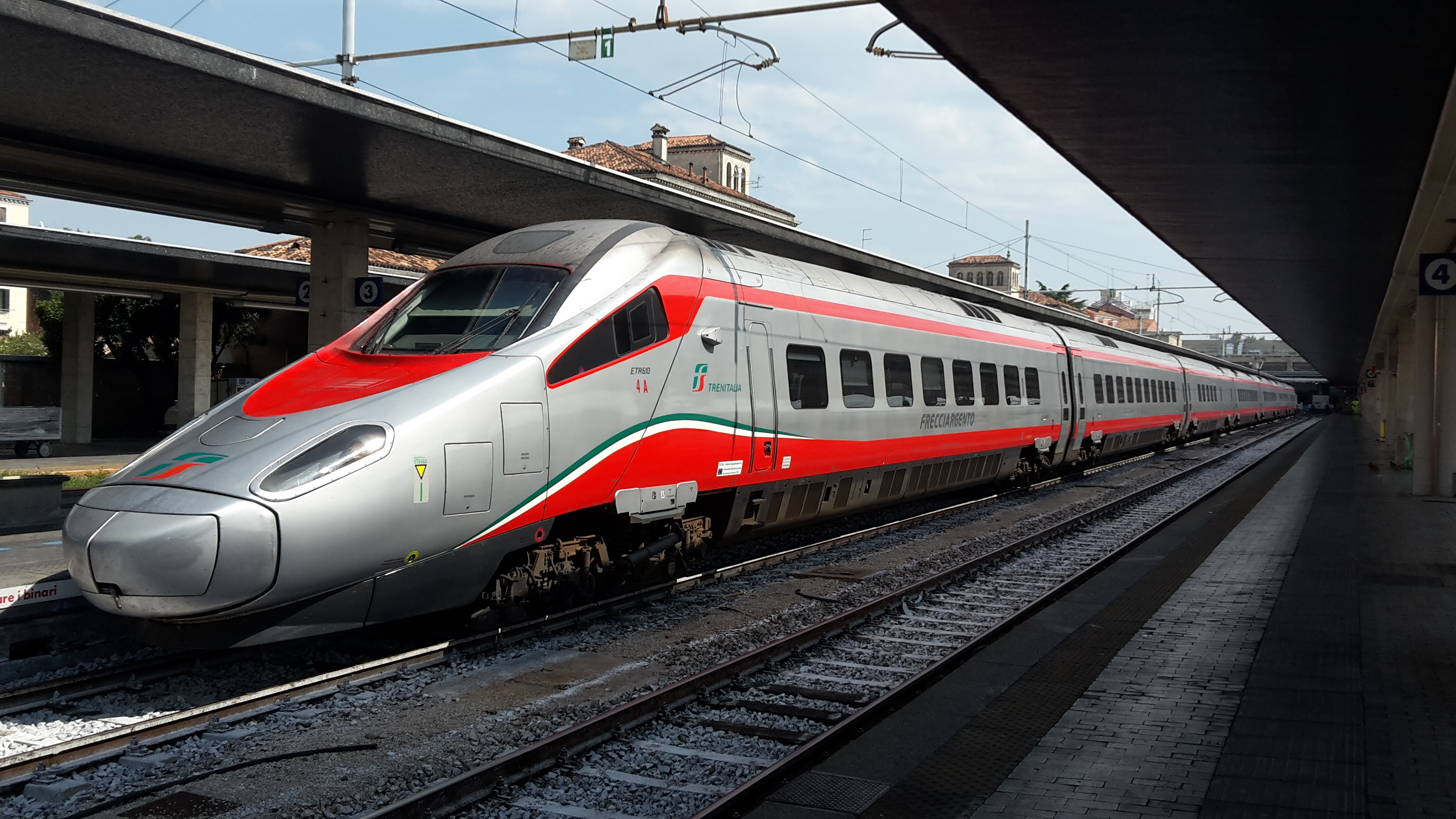
A Frecciargento branded ETR 610 high-speed trainset

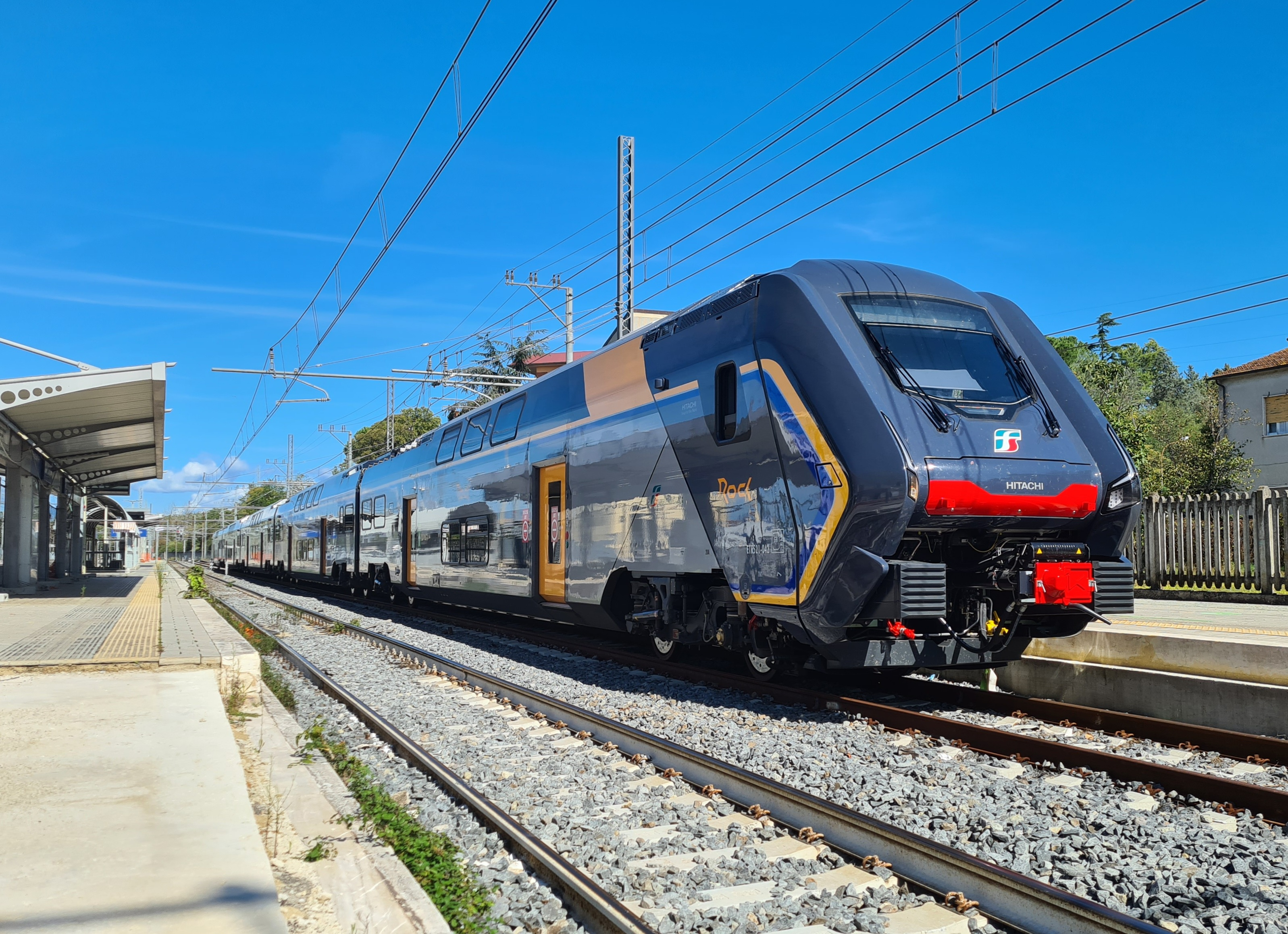
Trenitalia Rock regional train

As of 2023, there are several trains that run the Trenitalia service:

=== Regional trains ===
==== Locomotives ====
- Electric
  - E.464
- Diesel
  - D.445

==== Coaches ====
- Carrozza vicinale a piano ribassato
- Carrozze FS tipo MDVC
- Carrozza UIC-X
- Vivalto

==== Multiple units ====
- Electric
  - ALe 582
  - ALe 642
  - ALe 426 (TAF)
  - FS_ALn_501
  - ETR 324/425 "Jazz"
  - ETR 563/564 CAF Civity (only used in Friuli-Venezia Giulia)
  - ETR 421/521/621 "Rock"
  - ETR 103/104 "Pop"
- Diesel
  - ALn 668
  - FS ALn 663
  - ALn 501/502 "Minuetto"
  - ATR 220 Tr "Swing"
  - Autotrain ATR 365 (only used in Sardinia)
- Hybrid
  - BTR 813 "Flirt" (only used in Aosta Valley)
  - HTR 312/412 "Blues"

=== High-speed trains ===
- ETR 460
- ETR 470
- ETR 485
- ETR 500
- ETR 600
- ETR 610
- ETR 700
- ETR 1000

=== InterCity ===
- Locomotives
  - E.401
  - E.402B
  - E.403
  - E.412
  - E.414
  - E.464
  - D.445
- Coaches
  - 1° class Gran Confort coach
  - 1° and 2° class UIC-Z1 coach
  - 1° class Eurofima coach

== See also ==
- Rail transport in Italy
