= Flexicoil suspension =

Train suspension

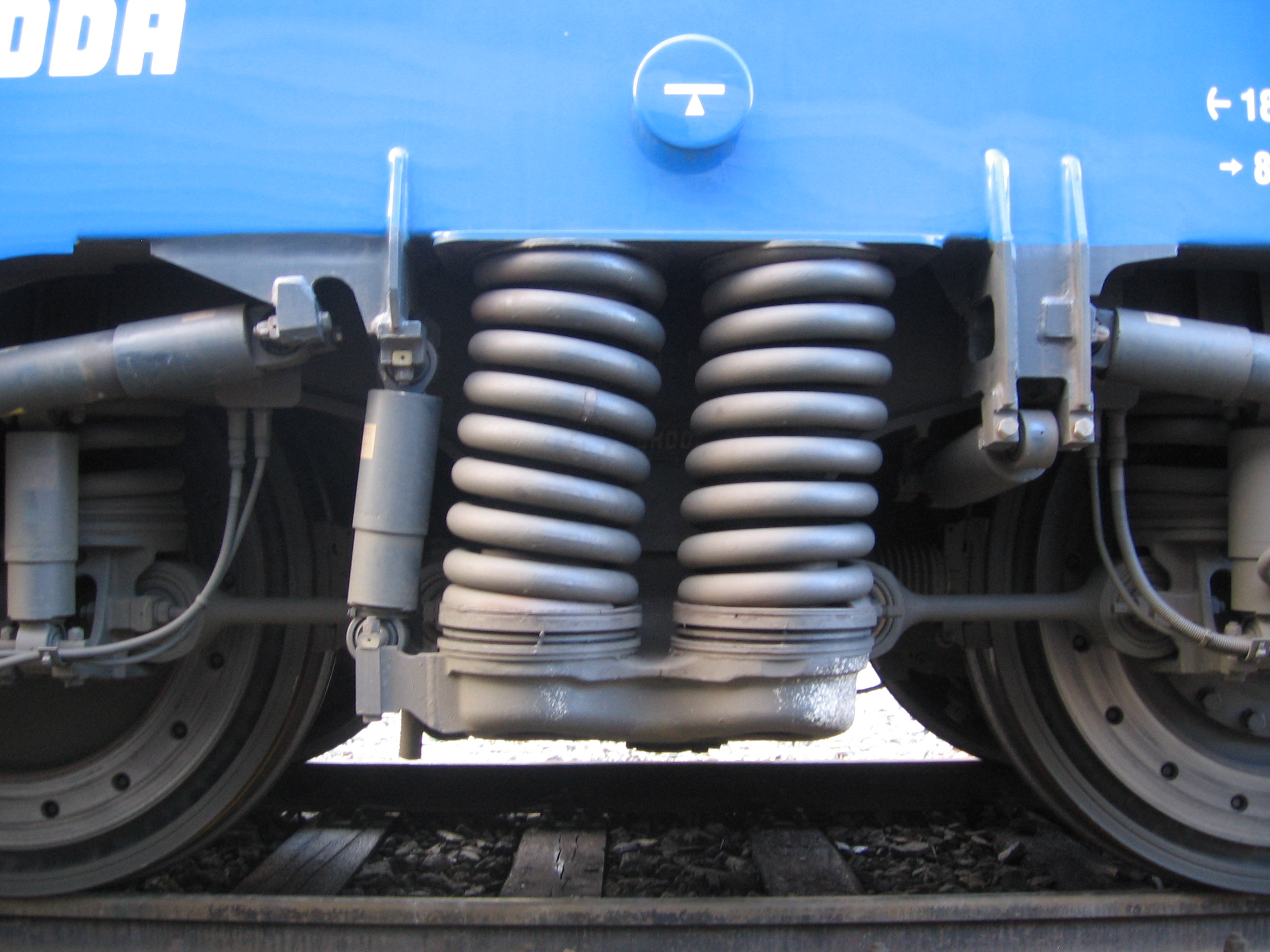
Skoda Flexicoil bogies on a ČD Class 380

Flexicoil suspension is a type of secondary suspension for railway vehicles, typically having steel coil springs between the bogies and chassis of a passenger coach, freight car, or locomotive. Suspension systems using steel springs are more common than those with air springs, as steel springs are less costly to make, relatively wear resistant, and require less maintenance.

== History ==
Flexicoil (though not known by this term) suspensions were fitted to locomotives in Spain, the Soviet Union and Africa as early as the 1930s. In Germany, Flexicoil suspensions were first used in the 1950s under high-speed electric locomotives, notably the DB Class 103.

== British Rail ==
Between 1969 and 1971, British Rail conducted tests of modified Flexicoil bogies under a modified Class 86, to prevent further track damage caused by the original Class 86 bogies; tests were successful and all Class 86 locomotives were refitted with the modifications in stages through the 1970s and 1980s.

== Technical details ==
The springs in a flexicoil suspension are made of steel. Protruding from above and below, and into, each spring is a spherical rubber dome that can absorb some of the horizontal forces. These domes are connected firmly to either the vehicle body (above) or the bogie frame (below). Under this arrangement, each flexicoil spring is twisted and moved from its vertical axis when the vehicle is cornering. This helps the two bogies to align themselves equally underneath the vehicle body. The vertical forces are absorbed entirely by the steel springs.

As the springs have relatively soft characteristics, hydraulic vertical dampers must also be installed for vibration damping at speeds higher than 160 km/h (99 mph), along with longitudinal dampers. Lateral damping is not normally required.

In railway passenger cars fitted with flexicoil suspension, the springs are the only mechanical connection between the bogie and the car body. In heavier types of flexicoil suspension rolling stock, a bogie pivot fitted with rubber-metal bearings is used to hold a cross anchor yoke, which transfers the forces to the bogie frame via two cross anchor link pins. Some, such as the Italian D.445 class, have additional traction rods.

Locomotive bogies are usually also provided with a weight transfer linkage, or with a different tension transmission.

== See also ==
- Glossary of rail terminology
- Bogie
