= Milan–Paris Frecciarossa =

Railway service between Milan and Paris

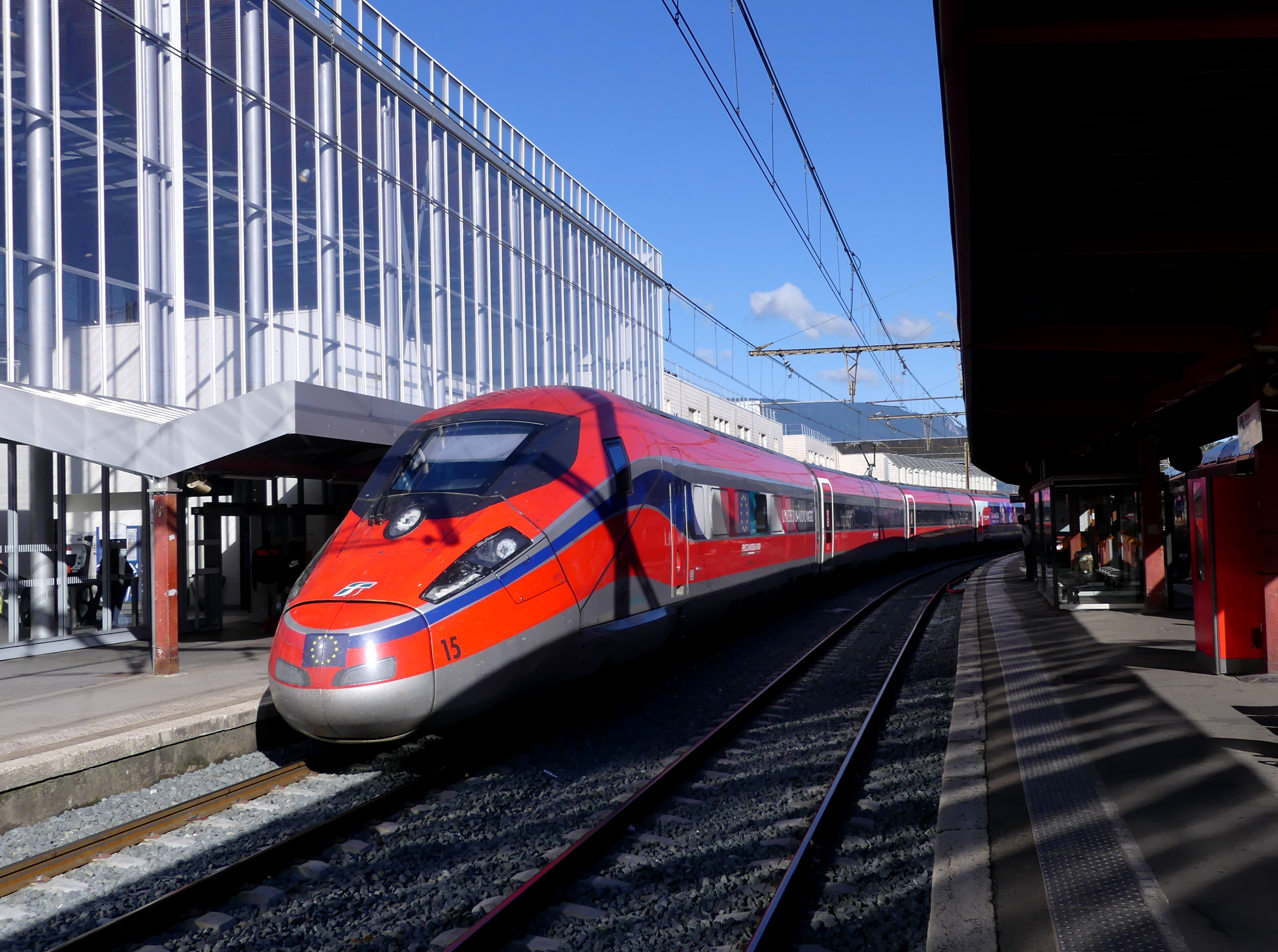
- FR9292 at Chambéry-Challes-les-Eaux station, April 2022

Overview
- Service type: International high-speed rail
- Status: Operating
- Locale: Italy; France
- First service: 18 December 2021
- Current operator: Trenitalia France
- Website: trenitalia.com

Route
- Termini: Paris Gare de Lyon; Milano Centrale
- Stops: 5
- Average journey time: 6 hours 50 minutes
- Service frequency: 2 trains/day (Milan–Paris); 5 trains/day (Paris–Lyon)
- Lines used: Turin–Milan high-speed railway; Turin–Modane railway; Culoz–Modane railway; Saint-André-le-Gaz–Chambéry railway; Lyon–Marseille railway; Paris–Marseille railway

On-board services
- Classes: Standard, Business, and Executive
- Catering facilities: On-board bar

Technical
- Rolling stock: Frecciarossa 1000
- Track gauge: 1,435 mm (4 ft 8 1/2 in) standard gauge
- Electrification: 25,000 V AC (Milano Rho–Turin, Lyon–Paris); 3,000 V DC (inner Milan, Turin–Modane); 1,500 V DC (Modane–Lyon)

The Milan–Paris Frecciarossa (Italian: Frecciarossa Milano–Parigi, French: Frecciarossa Milan–Paris) is a high-speed passenger railway service running between Milano Centrale and Paris Gare de Lyon, marketed under Trenitalia's Frecciarossa brand.

Inaugurated on 18 December 2021, the service is operated by Trenitalia France, formerly known as Thello, using Frecciarossa 1000 trains. Intermediate stops are Torino Porta Susa, Bardonecchia, Modane, Chambéry-Challes-les-Eaux, and Lyon-Part-Dieu. An additional five trains per day run between Lyon-Perrache and Paris Gare de Lyon, stopping at Lyon-Part-Dieu.

With the introduction of the Paris–Milan Frecciarossa, Trenitalia became the first company to enter France's railway market after SNCF. The full service between Milan and Paris was suspended on 27 August 2023 following a landslide near Modane, and restarted in April 2025. The service between Paris and Lyon remained operational during the suspension between Italy and France.

== History ==
=== Background ===
Until the COVID-19 pandemic suspended services on 10 March 2020, Thello, Trenitalia France's predecessor, ran an overnight service between Paris and Venice. Thello also operated a daytime service between Milan and Marseille through Genoa, which was officially scrapped alongside the Paris–Venice service on 1 July 2021. Before the Milan–Paris Frecciarossa, SNCF, France's state-owned railway company, ran services between Paris and Milan, having first served Milan in 2011.

In September 2019, Trenitalia announced plans for a Frecciarossa service between Paris and Milan, with an expected inauguration in December 2020. Tests to approve the Italian trains to run on the French network were conducted at a railway circuit in Tronville-en-Barrois. On 28 June 2021, an initial fleet of five Frecciarossa 1000 trains was authorised to run on the French railway network.

=== Launch ===
The Milan–Paris Frecciarossa was inaugurated on 18 December 2021, with a morning and afternoon train in each direction. An inaugural ceremony at Milano Centrale greeted the first train arriving from Paris Gare de Lyon, featuring actors with Napoleonic uniforms and can-can dancers. Tickets were sold from 13 December 2021, with fares starting from €29 on weekdays, and an average standard class fare of €51. Seating capacity was initially restricted to 80% by the COVID-19 pandemic.

With the introduction of the Paris–Milan Frecciarossa, Trenitalia became the first company to enter France's railway market after SNCF, made possible by the liberalisation of the European railway network through the European Union's Guideline 91/440. Trenitalia forecasted that it would eventually provide ten services daily, transporting 5,000 passengers.

=== Operation ===
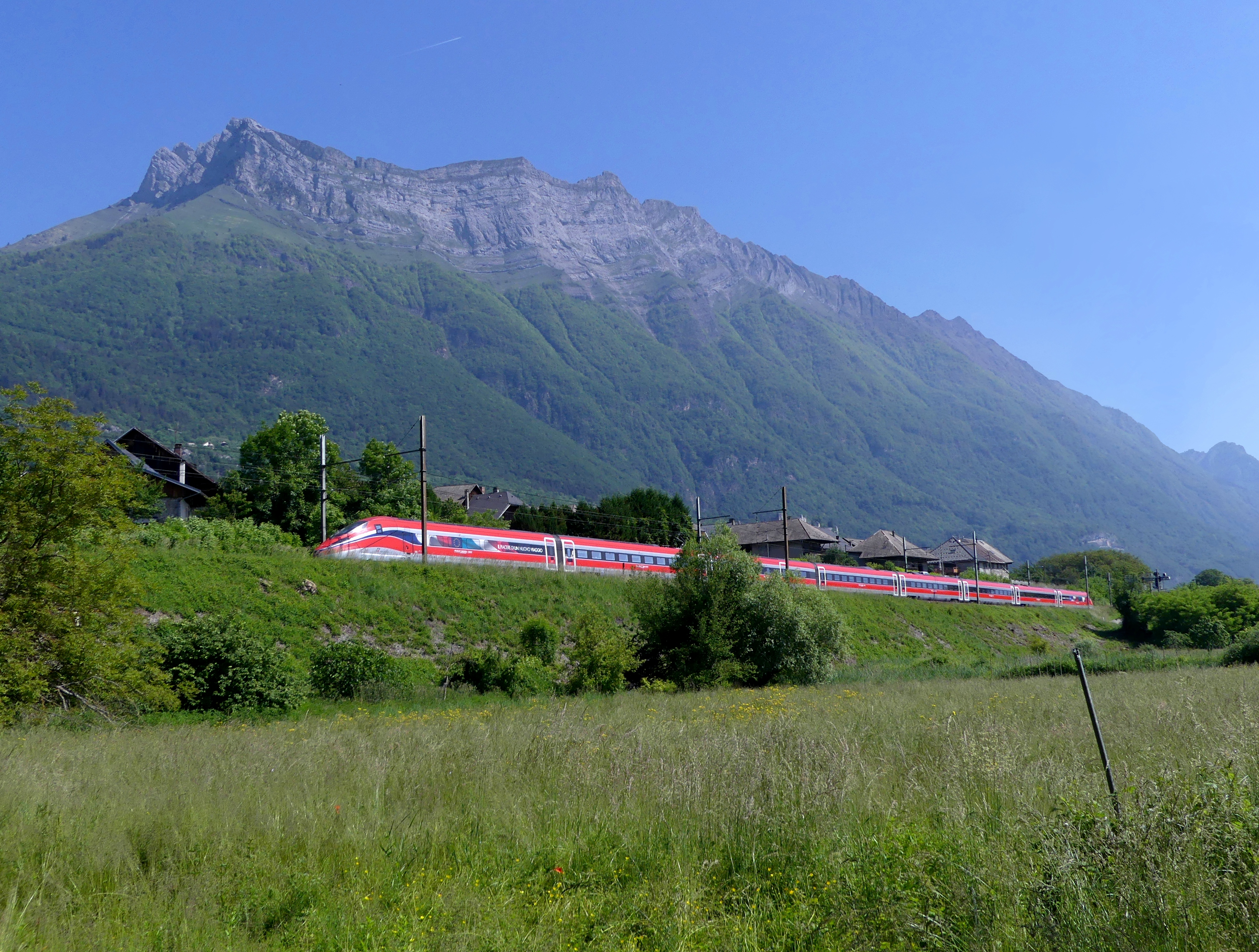
FR9281 passing Saint-Pierre-d'Albigny, May 2023

By February 2022, the services had an average occupancy rate of 83%, reaching peaks of 98% during the Christmas holidays, with 40% of tickets booked in the week preceding each journey. Reflecting on the route's success, Trenitalia advertised one job in Chambéry, four in Lyon, and thirteen in Paris.

On 5 April 2022, Trenitalia France introduced a shortworking service between Lyon-Perrache and Paris Gare de Lyon, with an intermediate stop in Lyon-Part-Dieu. Three trains in each direction per day were initially scheduled, increasing to five trains from 1 June 2022. The Paris–Lyon route is France's busiest high-speed route, with Trenitalia's services constituting a fifth of trains serving it.

Between 11 April and 8 May 2022, two carriages were painted with Disney themes, with a competition offering passengers the chance to win visits to Disneyland Paris.

By December 2022, a million tickets had been sold on the service, with the average fare dropping from €82 in 2021 to €68 in 2022. 79% of passengers travelled in standard class. Italians constituted 53% of passengers, with 34% from France, 6% from the United Kingdom, and 3% from the United States. The busiest routes were Paris–Lyon and Paris–Chambéry. According to data from Trainline, the competition introduced by Trenitalia reduced average fares along the Paris–Milan route by 8%.

=== Suspension ===
On 27 August 2023, a landslide led approximately 15,000 cubic metres (530,000 cu ft) of rock to fall on the railway tracks and adjoining A43 autoroute between Modane and Saint-Jean-de-Maurienne. Services were initially intended to resume on 29 August, then in mid-November. In October 2023, the reopening date was revised to summer 2024. From 10 January 2024, SNCF ran a partial service, with a replacement shuttlebus between Oulx and Chambéry. After extensive work, the re-opening date was revised to spring 2025.

On the 1st of April 2025, direct service between Italy and France was resumed with two round trip trains per day.

== Route ==
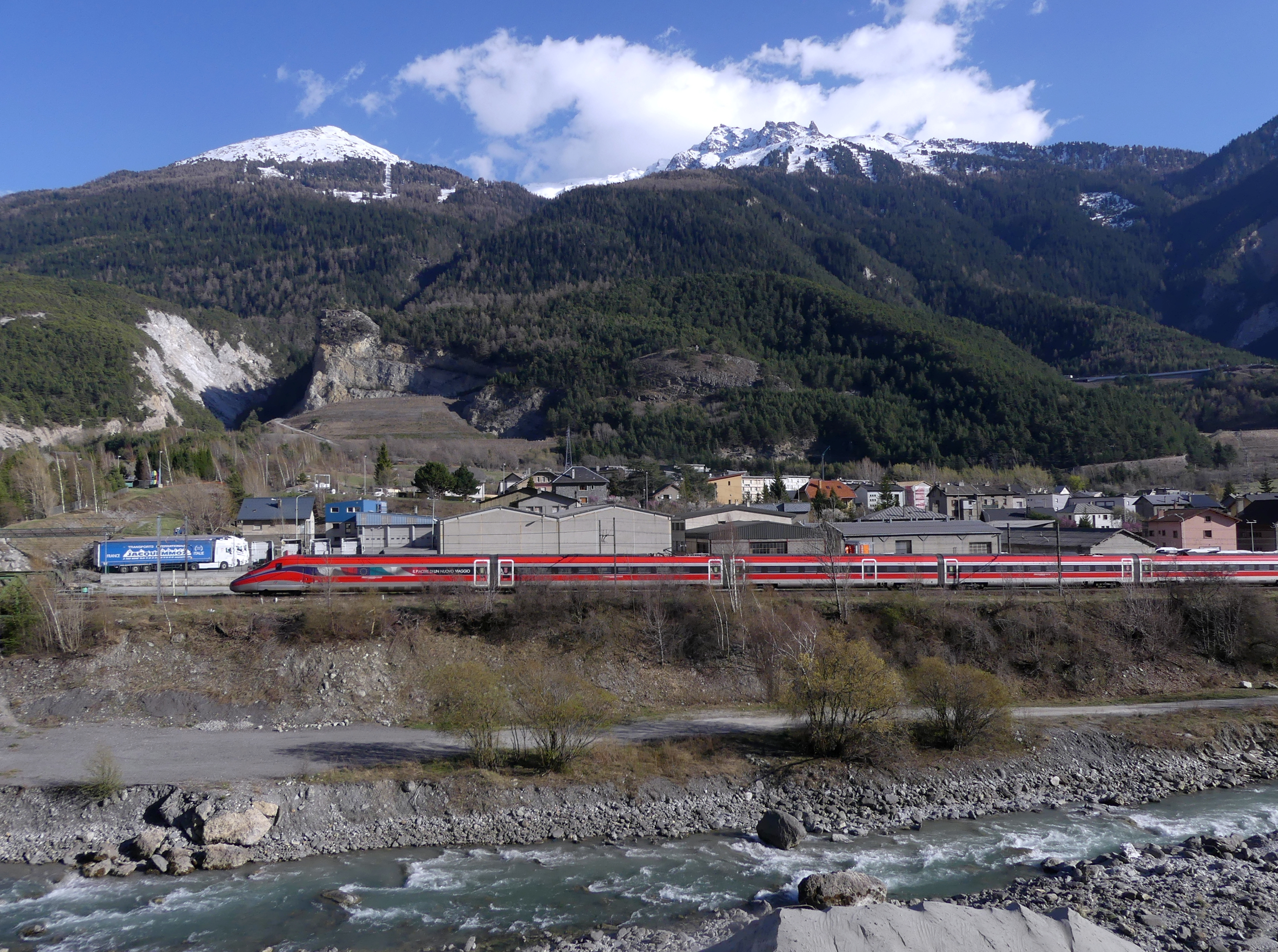
FR9296 approaching Modane, April 2022

The service begins at Milano Centrale using 3,000 volts DC. After Milano Rho, it runs along the Turin–Milan high-speed railway, at 25,000 volts AC, to reach its first intermediate stop, Torino Porta Susa. The service then runs along the Turin–Modane railway, electrified at 3,000 volts DC. Some trains call at Bardonecchia and, after the international border, all services call at Modane. The train stops for a customs and police control at the international border, which usually takes ten minutes: the schedule allows some flexibility through an extended stop in Lyon.

The service continues along the Culoz–Modane railway, electrified at 1,500 volts DC, to reach Chambéry-Challes-les-Eaux. After Chambéry, the trains run along the single-tracked Saint-André-le-Gaz–Chambéry railway, which leads to the Lyon–Marseille railway, and the final intermediate stop at Lyon-Part-Dieu. Joining the LGV Sud-Est, the train returns to 25,000 volts AC to reach the terminus at Paris Gare de Lyon.

Compared to the Milan–Paris route used by SNCF services, by using the Turin–Milan high-speed railway, rather than the slower Turin–Milan railway, the Milan–Paris Frecciarossa saves forty minutes' journey time. On the other hand, the SNCF services call at Lyon-Saint-Exupéry rather than Part-Dieu, saving twenty minutes' journey time. The SNCF's services terminate at Milano Porta Garibaldi rather than Milano Centrale.

== Services ==
Before the service's suspension, two trains ran in each direction per day, with journey times ranging between 6 hours 42 minutes and 6 hours 57 minutes.

As of March 2024, the service runs five trains in each direction per weekday between Paris Gare-de-Lyon and Lyon-Perrache, with an intermediate stop in Lyon-Part-Dieu. On the weekends, four trains run in each direction per day between Paris and Lyon, and an additional service terminating at Chambéry instead of Lyon-Perrache.

=== Classes and facilities ===
The service includes three classes, branded as "comforts": standard, business, and executive. Each train also hosts a Sala Meeting, a bookable meeting room with a capacity for five people. Standard and Business Comfort classes are further divided into Allegro (transl. lively) and Silenzio (transl. silence) ambiances.

Each train is equipped with free Wi-Fi and a bar. A bilingual magazine, La Freccia Sans Frontières, is distributed on board.

=== Rolling stock ===
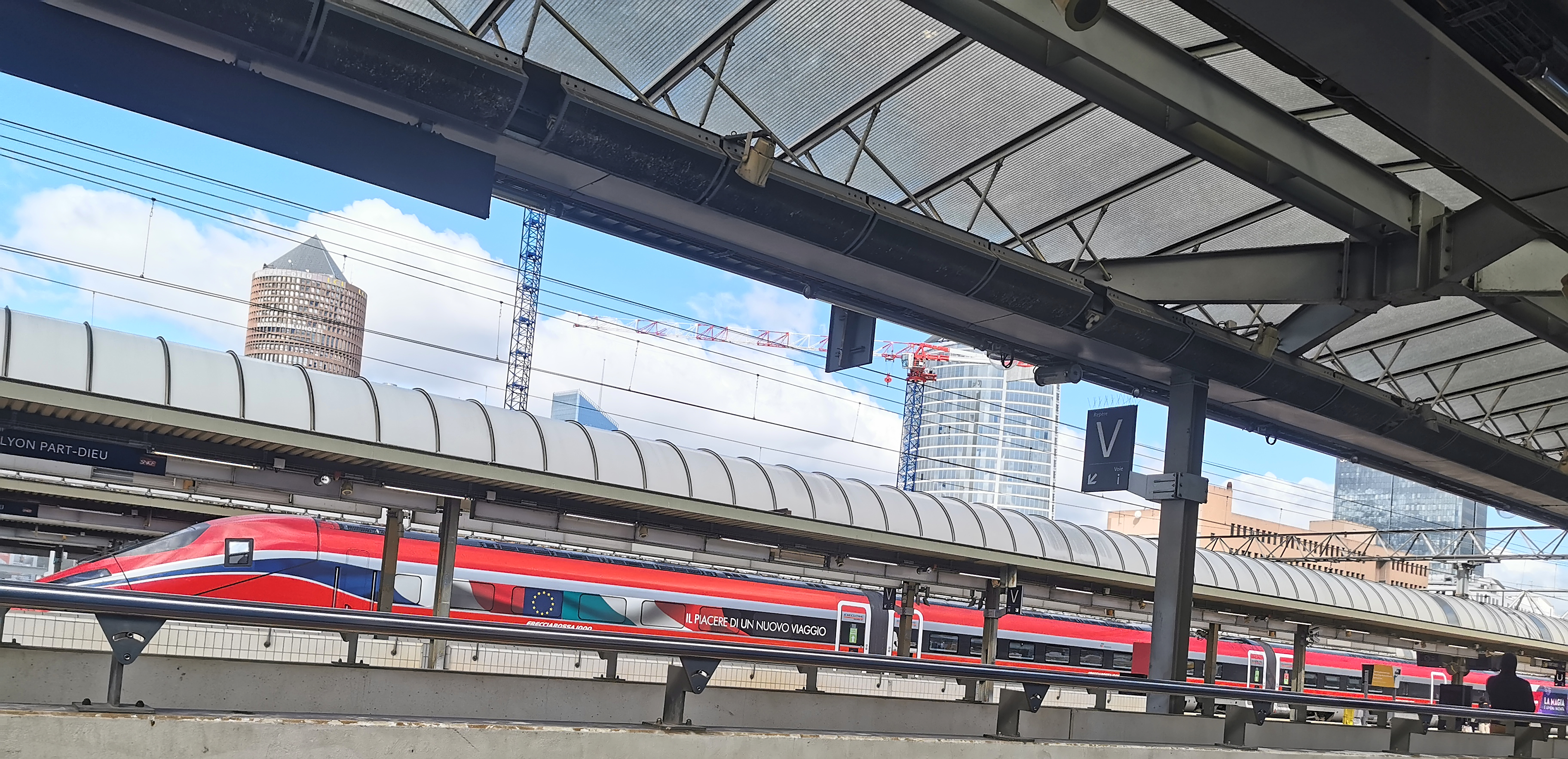
A Frecciarossa 1000 at Lyon-Part-Dieu, September 2022

The service uses Frecciarossa 1000 trains, built by Hitachi and Bombardier Transportation, each with a capacity of 462 passengers, travelling at 360 kilometres per hour (220 mph). The maximum speed between Turin and Lyon is 155 kilometres per hour (96 mph). The train does not change drivers and engines at the international border.

== Controversies ==
The service's inauguration was criticised for highlighting Italy's infrastructural inequality, with slower train services in southern Italy.

An on-board menu for business and premium classes was designed by chef and television personality Carlo Cracco. The menu, which costs €18, was criticised for its poor quality, prompting Cracco to defend it in the press.

Trenitalia has complained about France's high track access charges, which reach €39 per train-kilometre in the Paris–Lyon section. The company received a 37% discount to charges in its first year of operation, decreasing to 16% and 8% in the second and third years.

The initial service was criticised for the lack of a stop in the Susa Valley, in the Italian Alps. Among those campaigning for a stop were Alberto Cirio, the Piedmontese president, and Marco Gabusi, the regional councillor for infrastructure and transport. In February 2022, it was reported that Trenitalia France was considering a stop in Oulx or Bardonecchia, but was concerned by the additional stop time and border controls that operate in the section. From 11 December 2022, one train in each direction per day was scheduled to stop in Bardonecchia for the winter ski season.

== Incidents ==
On 23 December 2021, a train's arrival in Milan was delayed by 15 minutes after two passengers boarded the train in Torino Porta Susa with a green pass that was not theirs, requiring the police's attendance.

== See also ==
- High-speed rail in Europe
- High-speed rail in Italy
- Italian soft power
- Turin–Lyon high-speed railway
