= FS Class D.445 =

FS class D.445
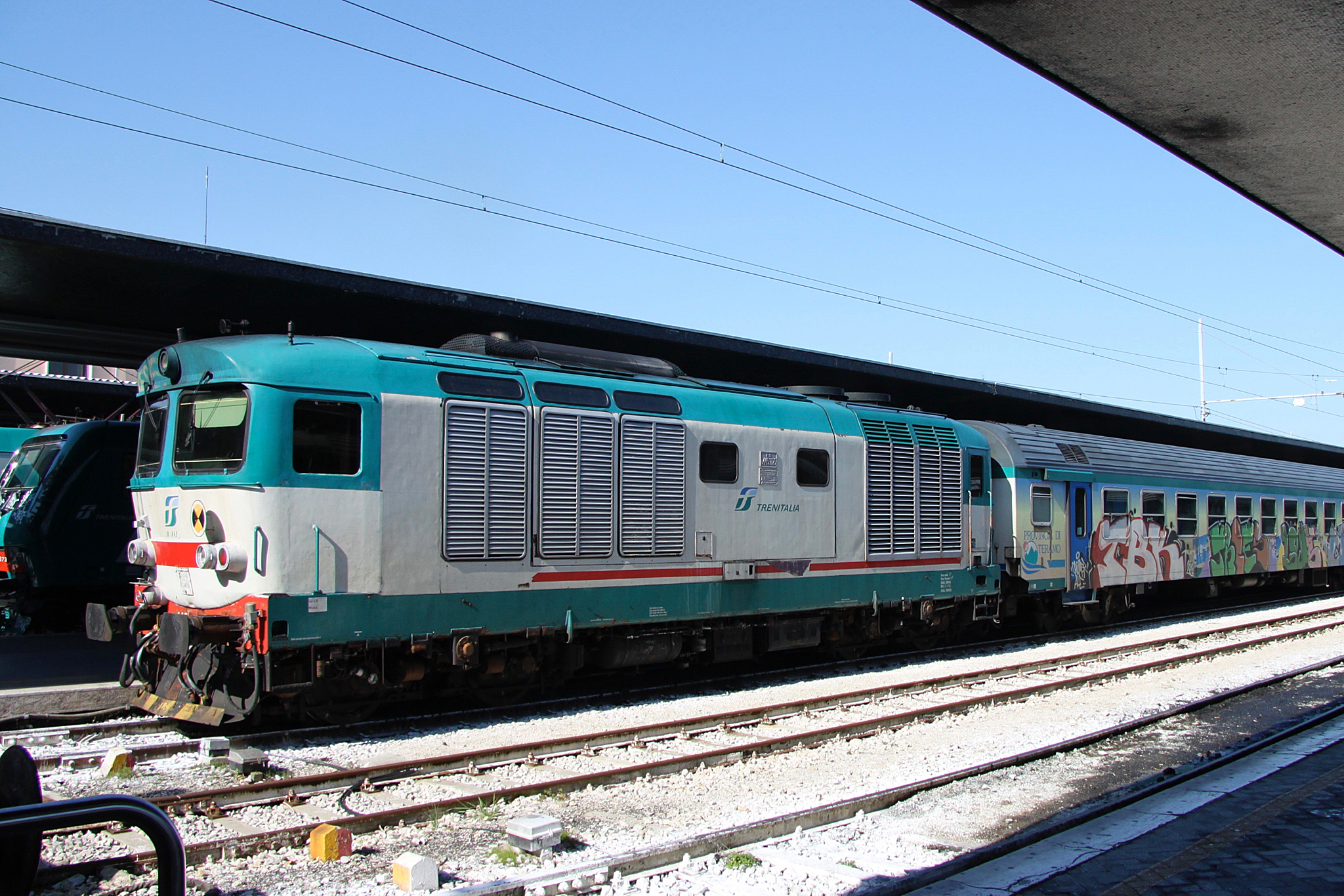
- FS D 445 1125 at Venezia Santa Lucia railway station
Type and origin
- Power type: Diesel
- Builder: FIAT
- Build date: 1974-1988
Specifications
- Configuration
  - UIC: B′B′
- Gauge: 1,435 mm (4 ft 8 1/2 in) standard gauge
- Wheel diameter: 1.040 m (40.94 in)
- Wheelbase: 8,460 m (27,755 ft 10 7/8 in) between bogie pivots
- Length: 14.100 m (46 ft 3 1/8 in)
- Width: 3.000 m (9 ft 10 1/8 in)
- Height: 4.280 m (14 ft 1/2 in)
- Loco weight: 73 t (72 long tons; 80 short tons)
- Fuel type: Naphtha, Diesel fuel
- Traction motors: DC series
- Transmission: 64/25
- Loco brake: Oerlikon FV4a
Performance figures
- Maximum speed: 130 km/h (81 mph)
- Power output: 1,560 kW (2,090 hp), 1,140 kW or 1,530 hp with all auxiliary equipment and carriage heating generator running
- Tractive effort: 220 kN (49,000 lb_{f})
Career
- Operators: FS Trenitalia
- Number in class: 150
- Disposition: In service

The Class D.445 is a class of diesel locomotives used by the Italian Ferrovie dello Stato (FS) railway company and by Trenord. 150 units were built between 1974 and 1988, divided into three series.

== History ==
The D.445 represented an evolution of the FS Class D.443 locomotive, maintaining the predecessor's reliability and operational capabilities. At the beginning of the 1970s FS, during a plan aimed at the expansion and modernization of current service, designed a new version of an unified diesel locomotive which could also resolve the issue of supplying power to heat carriages in an efficient way through a high voltage 2,800 V head end power supply (REC) fed by a secondary generator. Previous diesel locomotives were not provided with this and so required the use of a generator wagon (Carro Riscaldo), leading to increased weight. The first series of locomotives, introduced from 1974, were built with curved front windscreens which would be later replaced by cheaper and sturdier flat ones.

In 1979 a second series was ordered, fitted with the Italian standard 78 wire control equipment for use with driving carriages. At the end of the 1980s the whole group consisted of 150 units which allowed the retirement of the then old D.341 and D.342 locomotives.

== Description ==
The locomotive follows the general unified characteristics of other engines about the chassis and mechanical design. The biggest differences are inside the electrical part: the two MTSC 039/19 DC motors (permanently in parallel) are fed by a three-phase AC generator (in place of a DC one as previous locomotives) through a Graetz Bridge.

A high tension secondary DC generator provides a 300 kW (400 hp)/2750 V output, able to supply enough power for 7/10 coaches depending on the type of climatising equipment installed.

The prime mover is a FIAT A210-12 supercharged engine with 12 90° “V” cylinders with a displacement of 95.7 L (5,840 cu in) that produces 1,560 kW (2,090 hp) at 1500 rpm. The engine is cooled by a forced circulation of cooling fluid through radiators with two hydraulically driven fans.

The alternator is controlled by an electronic PWM control unit which is commanded by a 13 step regulator.

The bogies are a monomotor design with a 'dancing ring' coupling, giving a B′B′ wheel arrangement. They are suspended by a flexicoil arrangement, with additional traction rods.

=== Technical details ===
1st series units originally had curved windscreens, replaced in the 1980s by flat glas, later used on 2nd and 3rd series units. Their maximum allowed speed is 130 km/h (81 mph). Like most FS stock, some D.445 have received the XMPR color scheme (white, green, blue).

==== 1st series ====
The first series consists of 35 units (Numbered from 1001 to 1035), in green-over-Isabella brown livery. Equipped with three headlights, weren't provided with remote command system, applied starting from October 1996. They still had curved frontal glass panes.

==== 2nd series ====
The second series has 20 units (Numbered from 1036 to 1055), in the Navetta orange/purple livery used by push-pull trains. The main difference between 1st and 2nd series units was the addition of remote control equipment for use with control cars.

==== 3rd series ====
The third series has 95 units (Numbered from 1056 to 1150), in the same push-pull livery as the 2nd series. These units have five lights on each cab (three headlights and two red tail lights). Like 2nd series, they can be controlled by a control carriage.
