= Artesia (railways) =

Railway service in France and Italy from 1995 to 2011

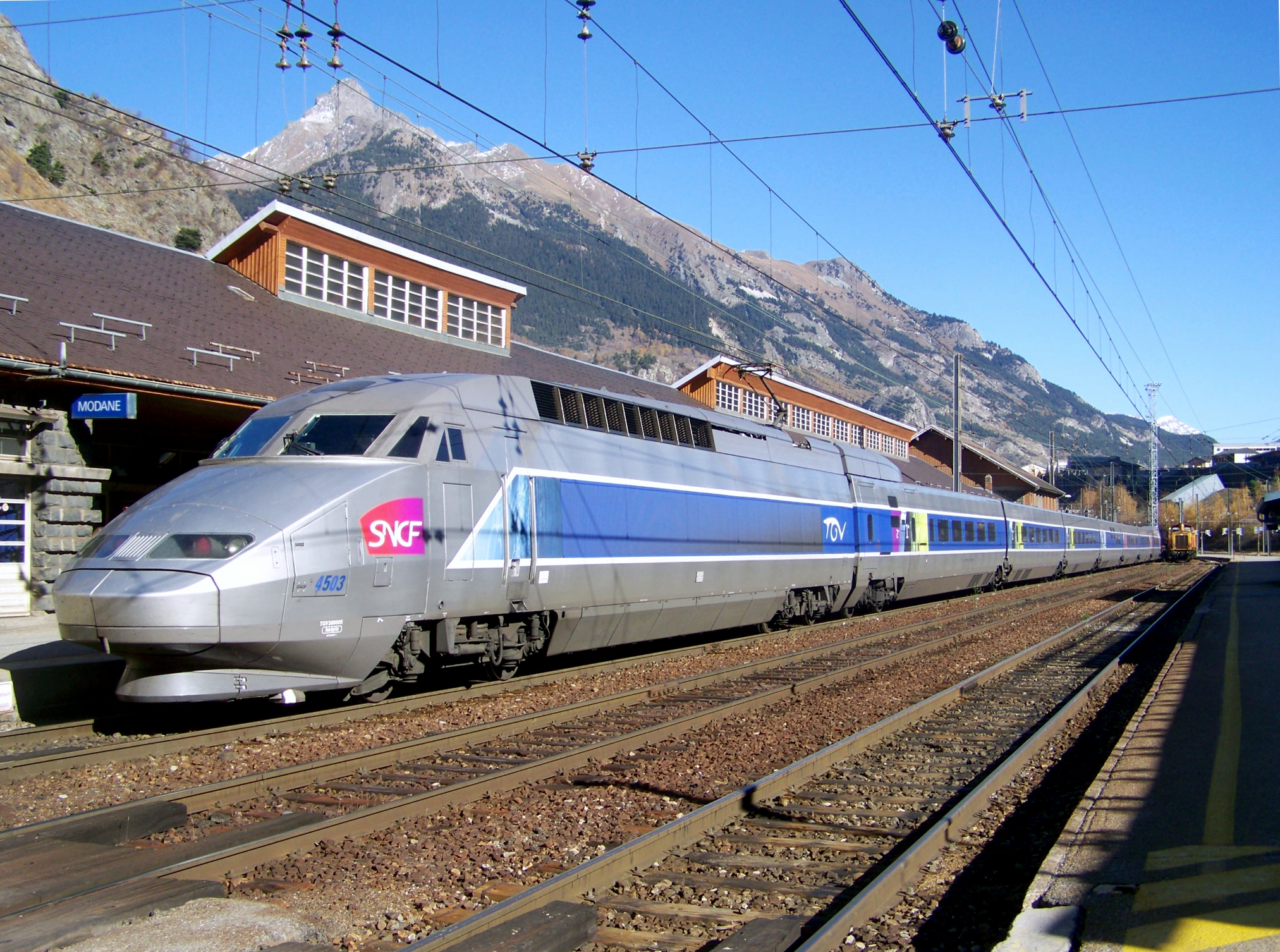
Sight of a French TGV coming from Paris and bound for Milano stopped at Modane station in Savoie, its last stop until the Italian border.

TGV Artesia was a service branding and joint venture between France and Italy from 1995 to 2011.

Trains were staffed by Trenitalia in Italy and SNCF in France. The bar/restaurant service was operated by Cremonini company. Between 2007 and 2011, routes include service between Paris Gare de Lyon and Paris-Bercy to Turin, Milan, Venice, Florence, Rome, and intermediate cities. Service to Milan operated via both Dijon (Vallorbe-Simplon line) and Lyon/Turin, while Venice, Florence, and Rome were only served through Dijon. Trains traveling through Dijon were night trains; those traveling through Lyon and Turin were day trains.

Artesia stopped operating on 14 November 2011 since SNCF took a 20% stake in Nuovo Trasporto Viaggiatori, which is Trenitalia's main competitor. Trenitalia then continues to operate night service with Transdev in a new joint venture called Thello; and SNCF continues to operate day TGV between Paris, Turin and Milan.

Artesia's regular services included the historic daily Paris to Rome service, the Palatino Express. This train, whose history may be traced back to 1890, ceased one month after the closure of Artesia in December 2011.
