= FS Class D.443 =

Class D.443
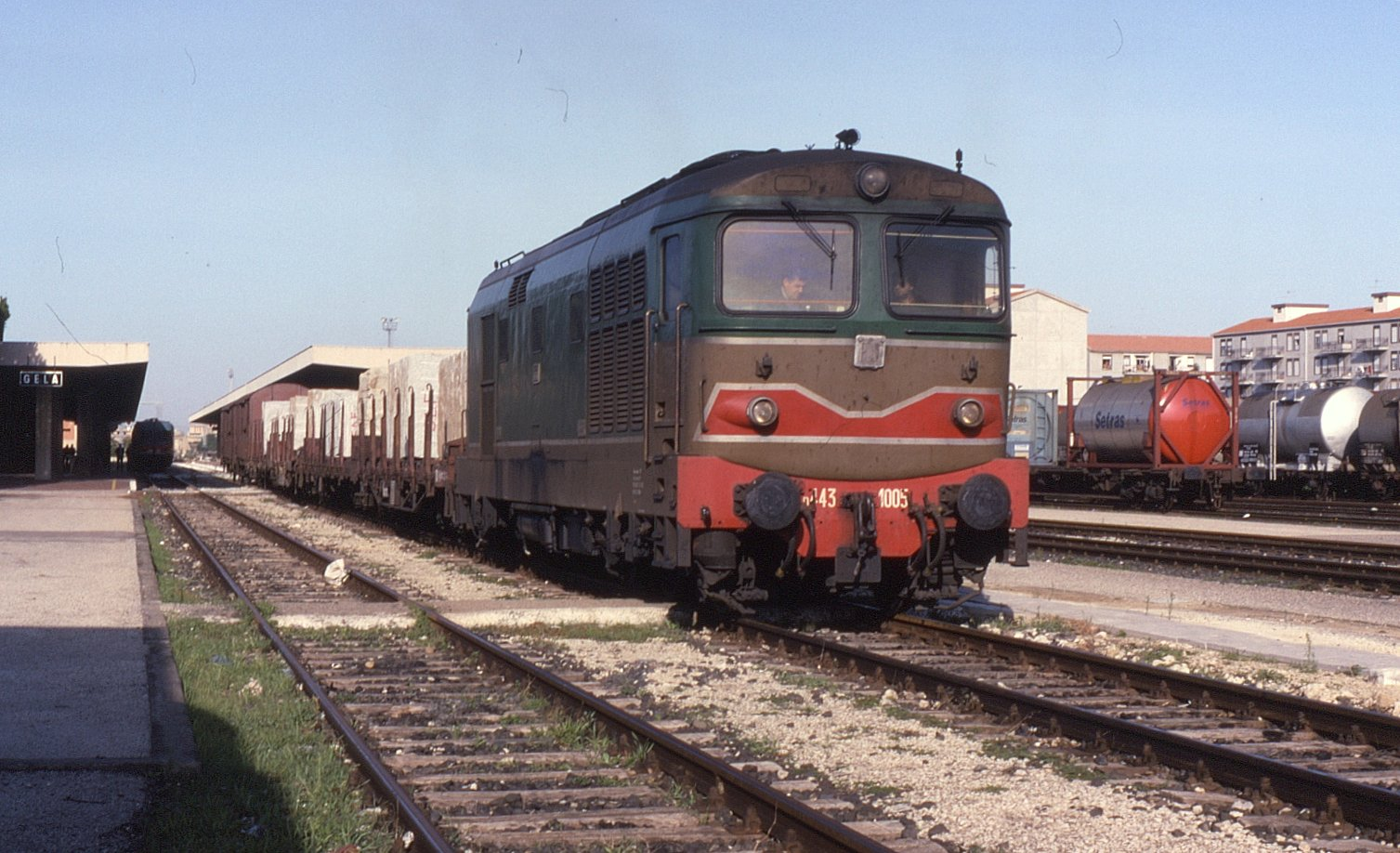
- D.443.1005 at Gela on Sicily, in 1995
Type and origin
- Power type: Diesel
- Builder: FIAT Grandi Motori, Breda
- Build date: 1967-1970
- Total produced: 50
Specifications
- Configuration
  - UIC: Bo′Bo′
- Gauge: 1,435 mm (4 ft 8 1/2 in) standard gauge
- Length: 14.1 m (46 ft 3 1/8 in)
- Loco weight: 72.1 t (71.0 long tons; 79.5 short tons)
- Fuel type: Diesel
- Transmission: Electric
Performance figures
- Maximum speed: 130 km/h (81 mph)
- Power output: 1,350 hp (1,010 kW)
Career
- Operators: FS/Trenitalia and others

The FS Class D.443 is a class of diesel-electric locomotive used in Italy, introduced in the late 1960s and still in service.

== History ==
D.443 was ordered by the Italian state railways, Ferrovie dello Stato (FS), at the same time than the D.343, but requiring generally higher performances and multi-role capabilities. The two types shared the same hull and the single-motored bogies, which had been designed by FS. 30 units were to be built by FIAT, the remaining 20 by Breda. The D.443 were mainly to replace the old steam locomotives which were used for heavy freight trains on light, not-electrified lines.

== Description ==
D.443 has one cab at each end, separated by two compartments including the engine-transmission pack and, in the other, the cooling devices. The two engines were both V-12, 1,900 hp (1,400 kW) of power, coupled to a DC 640/1080 V generator provided by Ansaldo. The two electric motors, designed by Breda, had a continuous power output of 622 kW (834 hp).

== Successors ==
From 1974, the D.445 class was introduced, with an AC alternator. They also supplied electric train heating.

== Sources ==
- Servizio Mat. e Trazione (1971). Automotrici termiche. Florence: Ferrovie dello Stato.
