= Italian soft power =

Italian soft power, the capacity of Italy to influence other countries and cultures without using coercive means has evolved and changed over time with modern Italy manifesting soft power primarily through Italian cultural heritage, language, cuisine, and diplomacy. Historically, Fascist Italy employed soft power through Italian cultural heritage, from the Roman Empire to the Renaissance. Joseph Nye defined soft power as the ability of a country to persuade others to do what it wants without force or coercion. Unlike hard power, which involves military and economic strength. Italy has been dubbed a "soft power superpower".

== Historically ==
=== In Fascist Italy ===
In the first half of the 20th century, Fascist Italy, under Mussolini, utilized soft power strategies alongside its more aggressive foreign policies to extend its influence and power abroad. This approach included leveraging the arts, science, and culture to further diplomatic goals, building upon pre-fascist traditions of cultural diplomacy. The 1930s, in particular, saw significant cultural exchanges between Fascist Italy and Nazi Germany, which, while ideologically driven by their respective regimes, also drew on established practices of cultural diplomacy that existed prior to their fascist governments.

The Fascist government leveraged cultural diplomacy to build political alliances and influence foreign public opinion. It focused on portraying themes such as the Roman era, the Renaissance, and the Risorgimento (the movement for Italian unification) in ways that supported its political agenda. Even though these cultural initiatives had a propagandistic slant, they played a significant role in extending Italy's cultural reach.

== Through culture ==
=== Language ===
The Italian language through institutions such as the "Dante Alighieri" Society have been assisted in spreading Italian language and culture worldwide. The establishment of Italian language courses, cultural centers, and the promotion of Italian literature globally have significantly contributed to Italy's cultural influence, making the language a tool for international engagement especially in cultural .

=== Cuisine ===
Italian cuisine represents a significant aspect of the country's soft power. Italian cuisine has influenced global culinary traditions and fostered cultural connections, with foreign chefs going to Italy to study and Italian restaurants prevalent worldwide. Iconic Italian dishes like pizza and pasta have become integral to global cuisine, serving as ambassadors of Italian culture. This culinary influence is strategically used to promote Italy's broader cultural appeal, with Italy organizing festivals and expos linking Italian gastronomy to Italy's soft power goals as well as strengthening Italy's global position in the fields. Gastronomy events like the “Week of Italian Cuisine in the World” and international culinary partnerships have enhanced Italy's global image and cultural influence.

=== Architecture and the arts ===
Italy's soft power is significantly evident in its contributions to architecture and the arts. Italian architecture, characterized by structures such as the Colosseum and the Pantheon of ancient Rome, and Renaissance works like Florence's Cathedral and the Vatican, has had a profound influence on global architectural practices and styles. Italian art has influenced European art markedly since the Renaissance period, with figures like Leonardo da Vinci, Michelangelo, and Raphael shaping Western art's trajectory. Italian universities and schools remain a substantial focal point of world art and Italy continues to draw cultural tourism, positively impacting its cultural influence internationally and contributing to the Italian economy. Significant international exhibitions related to the arts and architecture are held in Italy, most notably the Venice Biennale.

== Through diplomacy ==
The Directorate for Culture and Public Diplomacy, established as part of the foreign ministry, focuses on leveraging Italy's cultural strengths to build influence and global consensus. Italy's involvement in international organizations such as UNESCO and its active participation in international events like INNOPROM, thus Italy utilizes its cultural influence to further its diplomatic position. These diplomatic activities are said to serve multiple objectives. For instance, Italy's participation as a partner country in INNOPROM-2021 was not limited to showcasing industrial strengths but also included a range of cultural interactions, highlighting Italian cultural heritage and lifestyle.
