= Trenitalia France =

Train operator owned by Italian company Trenitalia

- Company type: Private
- Industry: Public transport
- Founded: 6 October 2011
- Headquarters: Trenitalia France; Tour de Lyon; 185 Rue de Bercy; F - 75012 Paris, Paris, France
- Area served: France and Italy
- Key people: Roberto Rinaudo (President)
- Services: High-speed train services
- Revenue: 38,587,737 euro (2024)
- Net income: −68,431,904 euro (2024)
- Owner: Trenitalia
- Website: trenitalia.com

Trenitalia France is an open-access train operator running international services between France and Italy. It was originally established under the Thello brand in October 2011.

On 11 December 2011, Thello ran its first night service, having rapidly come into operation to take advantage of a vacant niche opened by the withdrawal of the Artesia cross-border service only one month prior. The operator was initially structured as a joint venture, its ownership being divided between the Italian state-owned train operator Trenitalia and the French conglomerate Veolia Transdev. During June 2016, Transdev sold their share in the venture to Trenitalia. Within its early years of operations, Thello sought to expand onto other routes, including to direct compete with Thalys on the Paris-Brussels cross-border service. On 21 March 2018, the company announced that it was taking steps to establish its own high speed services between France and Italy in the coming years.

Thello services were heavily impacted by the COVID-19 pandemic of 2020, being heavily curtailed in March of that year. During the following year, it was decided to permanently terminate all operations on 1 July 2021. The move marked the retirement of the Thello brand. During October 2021, it was announced that cross-border services between France and Italy would be restarted in the coming months; the same announcement revealed that the Trenitalia France brand would be used instead. On 18 December 2021, a high-speed train service was launched between Paris and Milan; in contrast to the slower rolling stock used by the prior Thello service, Frecciarossa 1000 trainsets have been operated instead.

== History ==
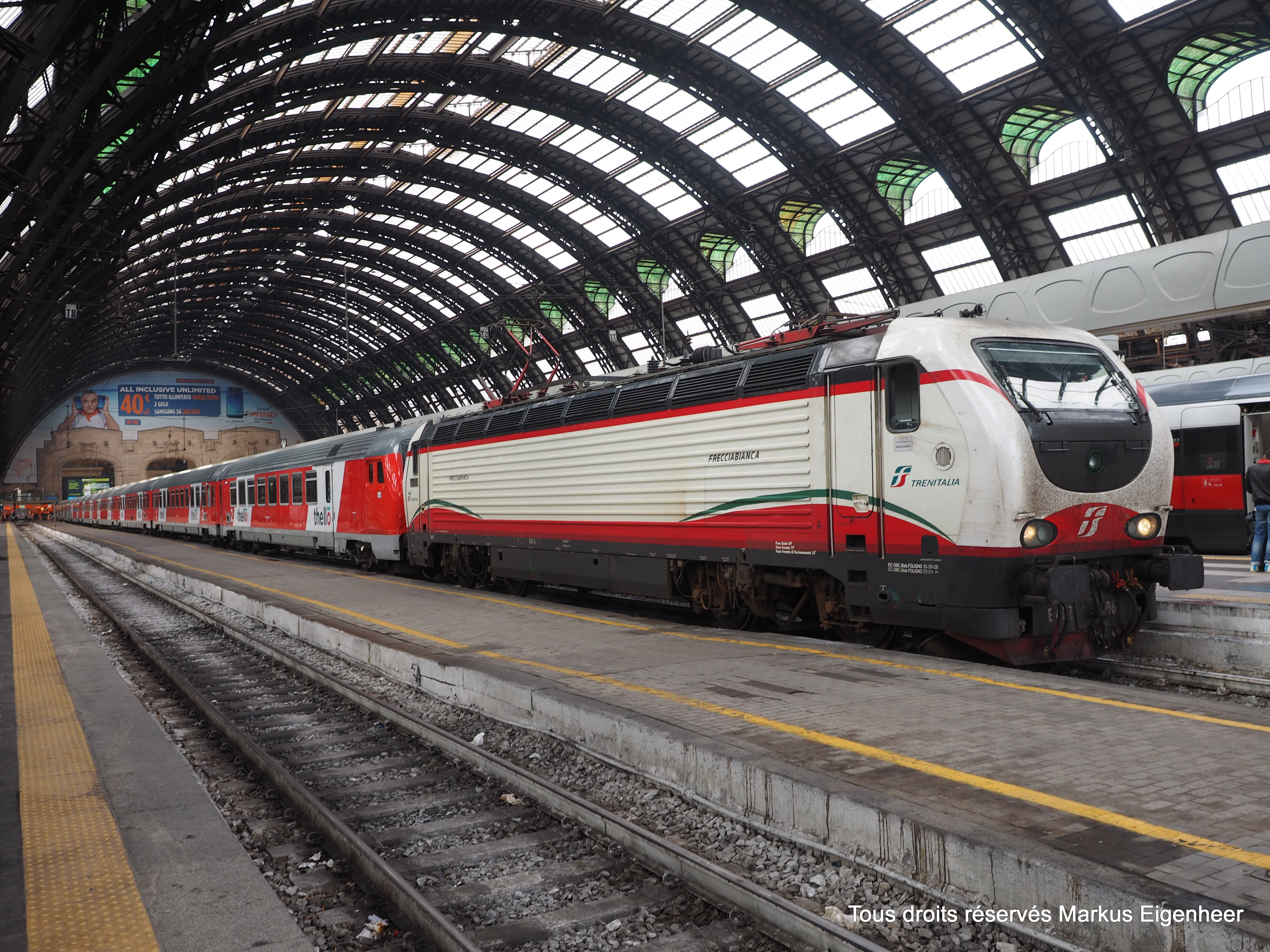
A Thello Milan-Nice train at Milano Centrale, April 2015

In November 2011, operations of the Artesia cross-border service, which ran trains between Paris and several Italian destinations, was permanently terminated after the French national railway operator SNCF decided to withdraw its involvement in the venture. Even prior to its discontinuation, Trenitalia and Veolia Transport (later Transdev) had announced their plans to jointly operate a new train operator, branded Thello, that would run day and night international services between the two countries.

From 11 December 2011, night trains run by Thello operated daily on the route between Paris Gare de Lyon, Dijon-Ville, Milano Centrale, and Venezia Santa Lucia. Cabotage, the carriage of domestic passengers on a leg of the international journey, was not permitted, and tickets between Paris and Dijon were not offered by Thello.

In December 2012, Thello took over services between Paris, Firenze Santa Maria Novella, and Roma Termini, which had previously been operated by Artesia. However, on 14 December 2013, the service was withdrawn after only a single year of operation. The specific reason given was difficulties in obtaining timetable routes with attractive travel times on the route; specifically, Albert Alday, Thello's CEO, observed that the closure of the St Maurice tunnel had made it impossible to secure train paths for a large portion of 2014. An additional factor was Trenitalia offer of improved connections via its high-speed services to reduce journey times between the two capitals.

During 2013, the company acquired the safety certificate required for traffic on the Belgian railway network. Thello had announced that they wanted to operate in direct competition with Thalys on the Paris-Brussels route; however, no such services would ever materialise. Following the granting of permission by regulatory authorities that same year, Thello operated daytime trains between Milan and Marseille, via Genoa and Nice from December 2014. From 12 April 2015, the frequency of direct trains between Nice and Milan was increased from one to three daily services.

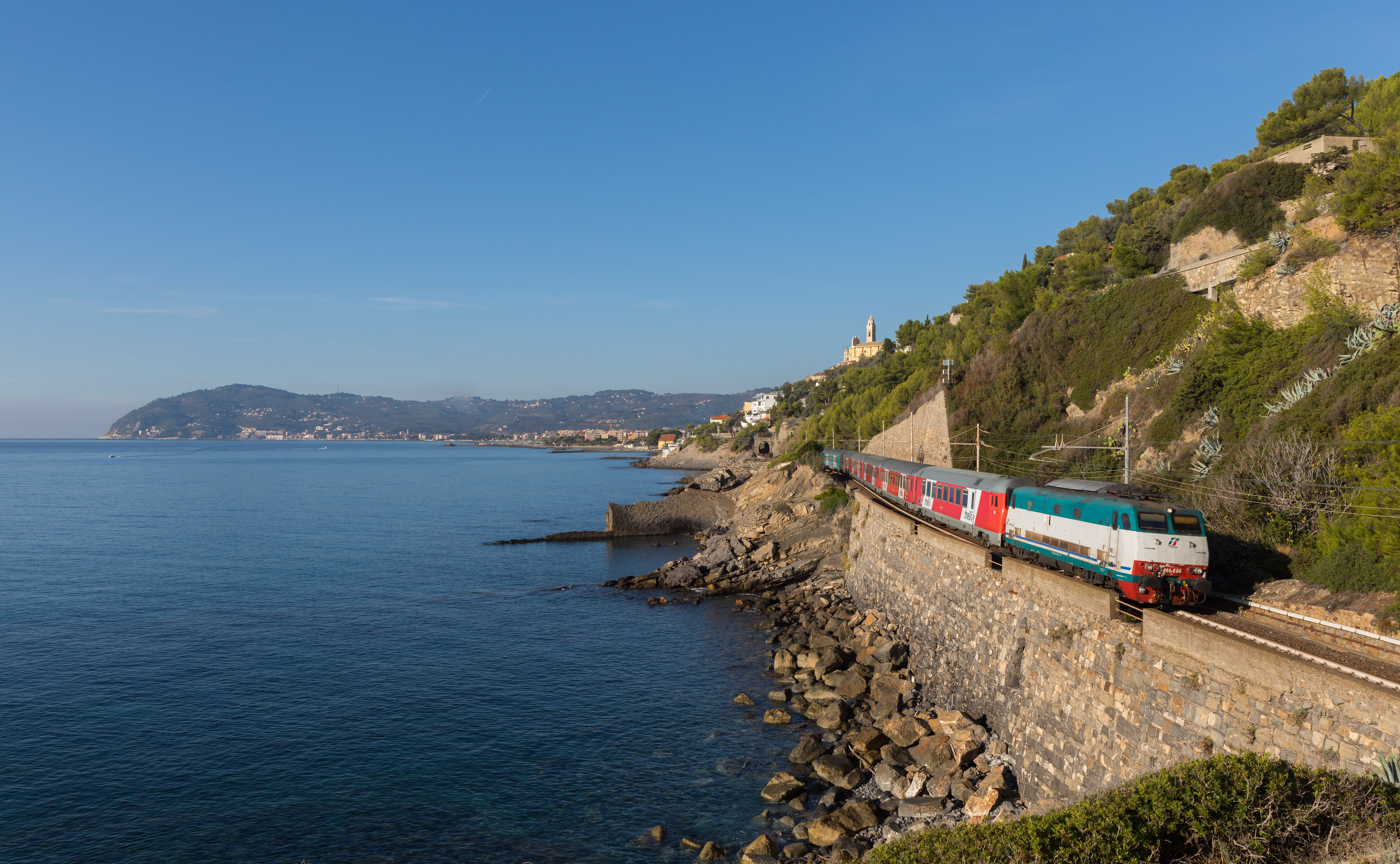
E 444 084 hauls a Thello Eurocity along the Ligurian Coast, October 2016

In June 2016, Transdev sold their 33% share in Thello to Trenitalia, giving their Italian partner full control over Thello. Transdev stated that poor revenues were due to increased customs controls thanks to the European migrant crisis, the Paris terrorist attacks in November 2015 as well as delays caused by railway engineering works.

On 21 March 2018, Roberto Rinaudo, Thello's CEO, announced the company's ambitious to operate a daytime high speed service that would link Milan, Turin, Lyon, and Paris; it was also stated that the booking of train paths for the new service had already commenced. In June of the following year, further details emerged; the envisioned service, which was stated to potentially begin as early as June 2020, would be operated by Italian Frecciarossa 1000 trainsets and was declared to have a total journey time of six hours and 45 minutes end-to-end, more than 20 minutes faster than the existing TGV services due to the Frecciarossia trains being fitted with the necessary European Train Control System (ETCS) apparatus to facilitate their running on the Turin–Milan high-speed railway.

In March 2020, Thello overnight services between Paris and Venice were suspended due to the COVID-19 pandemic having caused a significant drop in patronage; at the same time, the daytime train service was also cut back to run between Nice and Milan. During June 2021, all services under the Thello brand were withdrawn; at the same time, Trenitalia announced its focus on operating high speed services between the two countries in the aftermath of the pandemic. The service's permanent withdrawal was criticised, given the reduction in services between Nice and Milan; the decision also contrasted sharply against efforts by other operators (such as ÖBB Nightjet) to increase the number of night trains in Europe around the same time.

=== Milan–Paris Frecciarossa ===
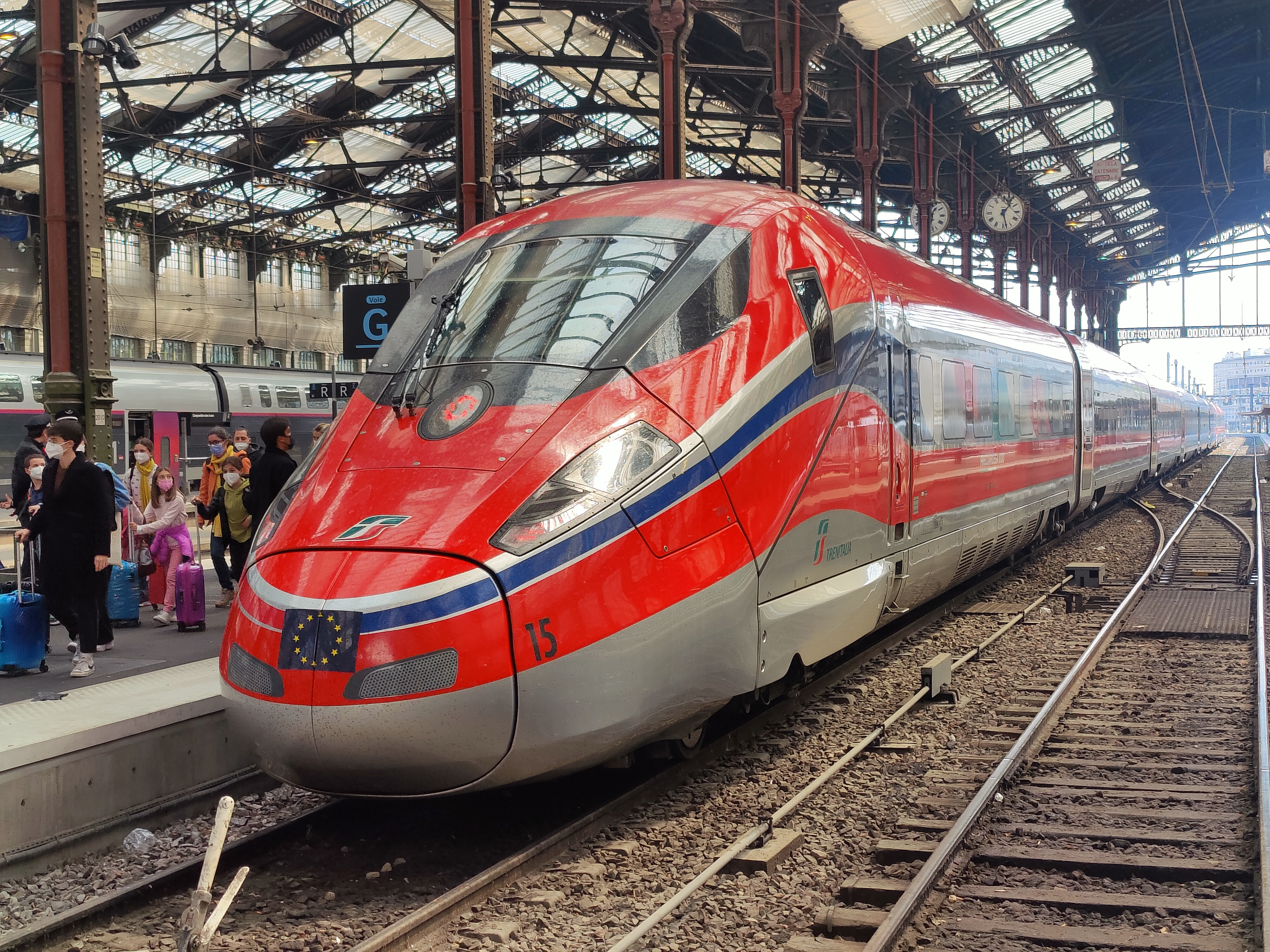
ETR1000 Frecciarossa at Gare de Lyon, in Paris (2022).

Despite the withdrawal of Thello, Trenitalia remained interested in running high speed services between the two nations. Accordingly, during October 2021, it was announced that Trenitalia would be relaunching cross-border services between France and Italy under the Trenitalia France brand; in support of this, a test train had been run in the previous month while approval for the rolling stock had been received back in June of that same year. On 18 December 2021, the Milan–Paris Frecciarossa was launched. Differences from the prior operation include a focus on high speed service, including exclusively running Frecciarossa 1000 trainsets so far.

On 5 April 2022, Trenitalia France introduced a shortworking service between Lyon-Perrache and Paris Gare de Lyon, with an intermediate stop in Lyon-Part-Dieu. Three trains in each direction per day were initially scheduled, increasing to five trains from 1 June 2022.

== Rolling stock ==
=== Current high-speed services ===
In 2025, current services using the Frecciarossa 1000 are:

- Paris Gare du Lyon - Lyon Perrache/ Part Dieu (5 round trips per day)
- Paris Gare du Lyon - Milan (2 round trips per day)

There are plans for services between Paris - Marseille and Paris - Lyon from June 2025.

=== Former services ===
The train operating staff was Trenitalia's in Italy and Thello's in France.

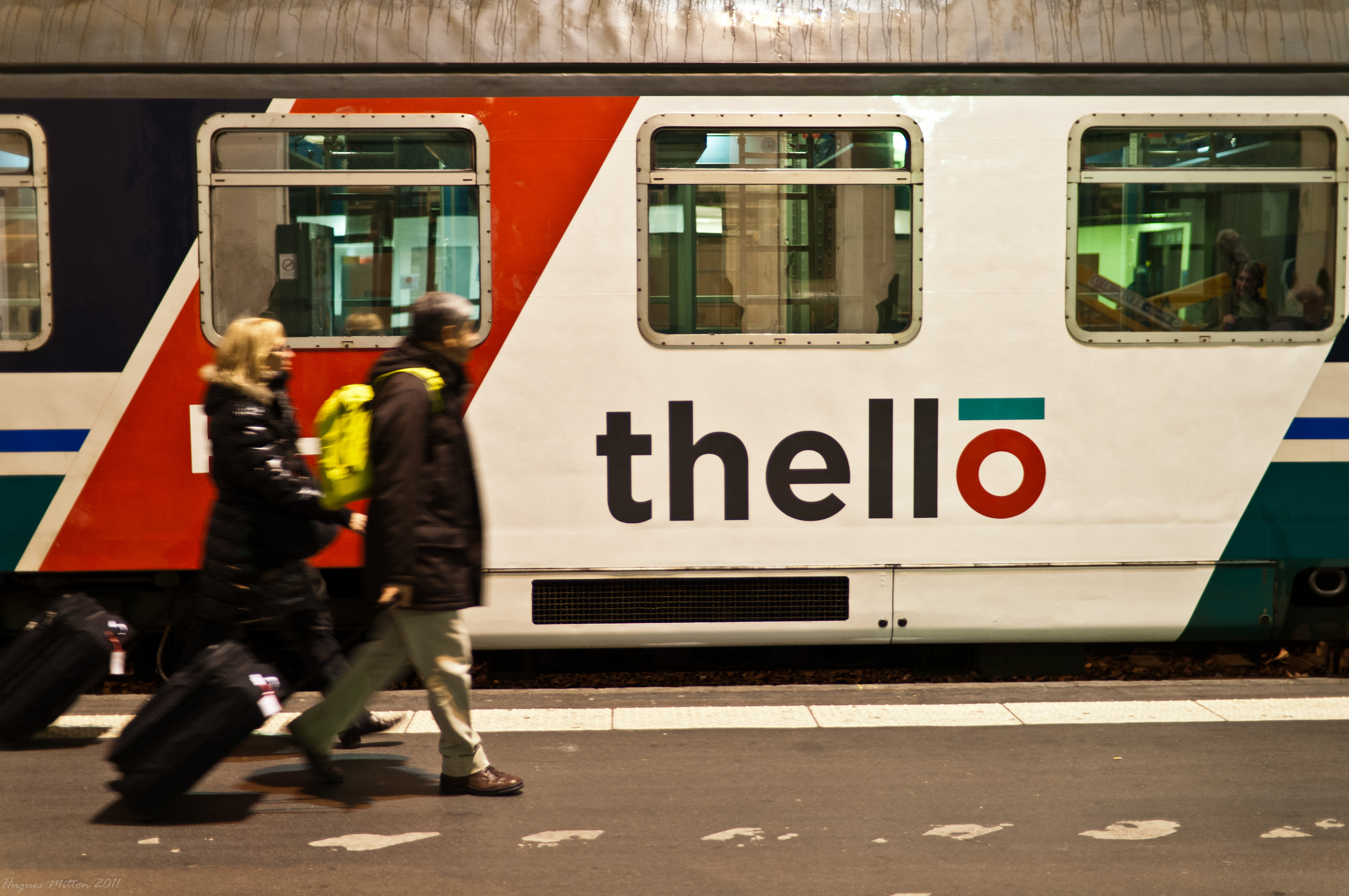
First Thello train at Paris Gare de Lyon station on 11 December 2011

Initially, the carriages were leased by Trenitalia and the locomotive was leased from Akiem by SNCF Geodis. The locomotives used were three-system SNCF Class BB 36000 electric locomotives uprated from 160 km/h (99 mph) to 200 km/h (120 mph) operation in France to the Italian border. The sleeping cars were type MU, a design originally created for the Wagons-Lits Company, built between 1964 and 1974, while refurbished by Trenitalia during the mid-2000s at which point LED lighting & corridor CCTV were fitted while carpeting was removed. Each sleeping car had 12 compartments with washbasin, each usable as single, double, or triple. Couchette cars were of various types and could be used as four berth or six berth.

Thello night trains had three classes:

- six berth couchette
- four berth couchette
- one-to-three berth sleeping compartments

Some services also comprised a restaurant car operated by LSG Sky Chefs, where passengers could be served both dinner and breakfast on board.
