= Public transport =

Shared transportation service for use by the general public

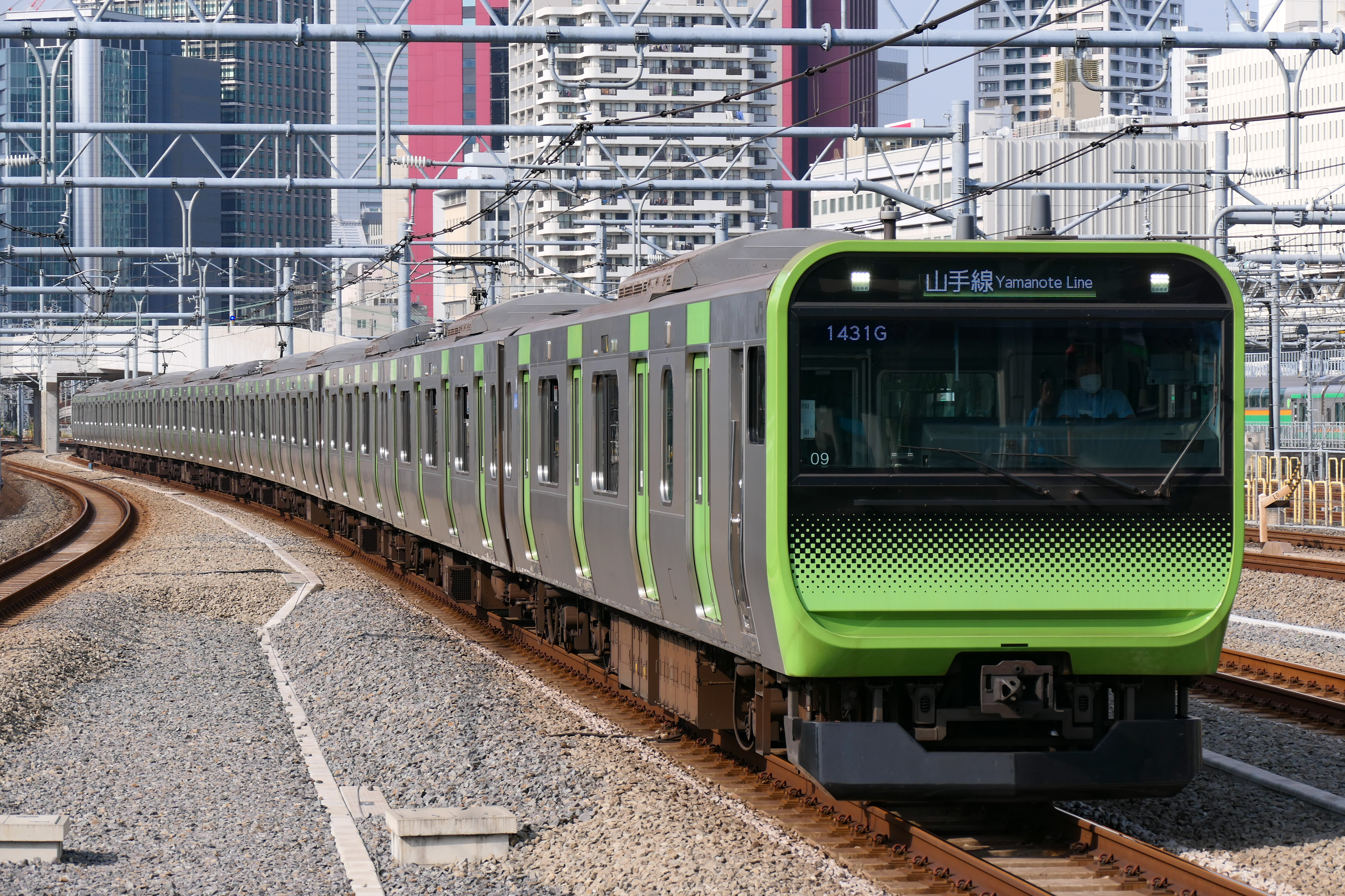
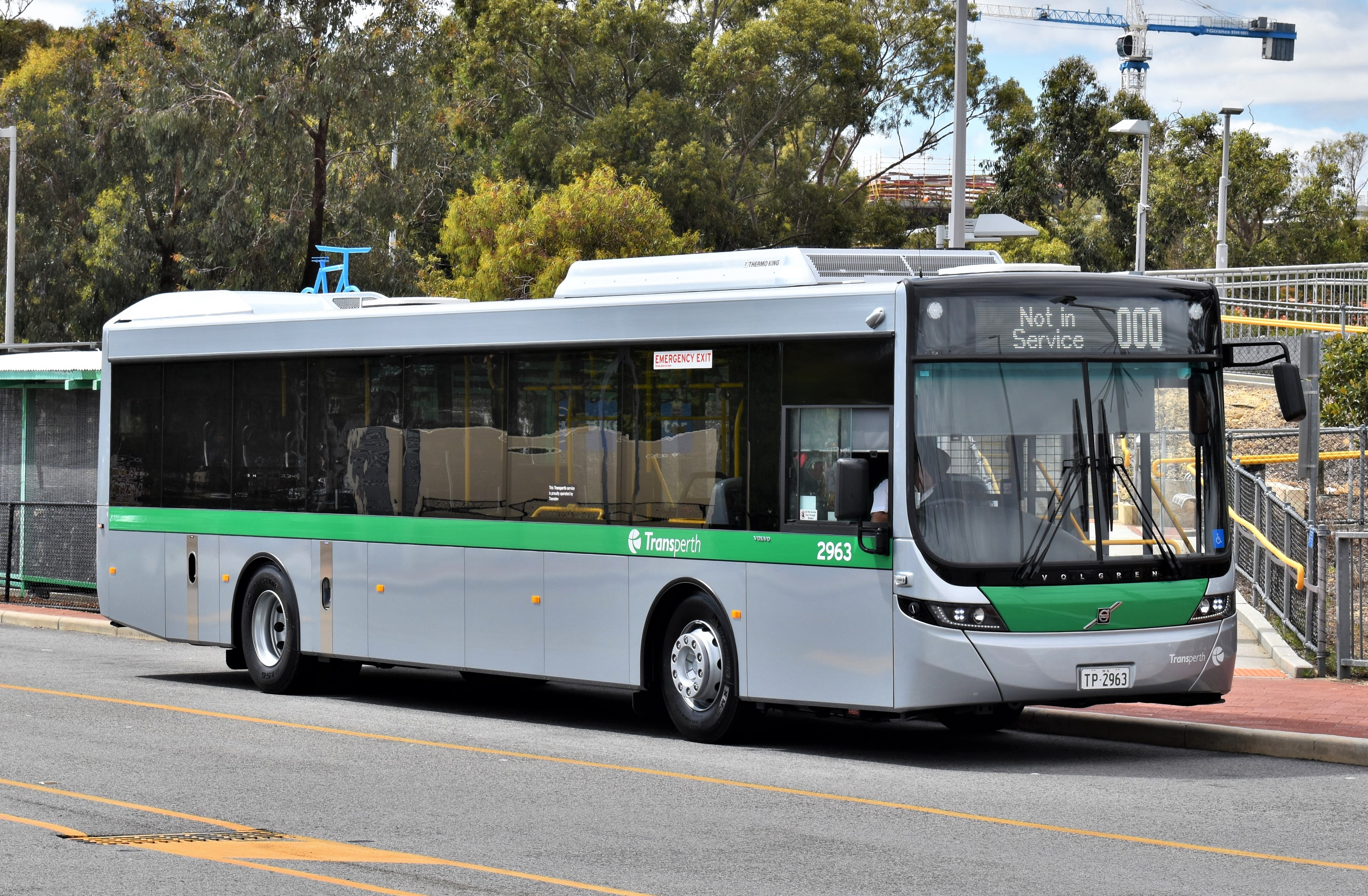
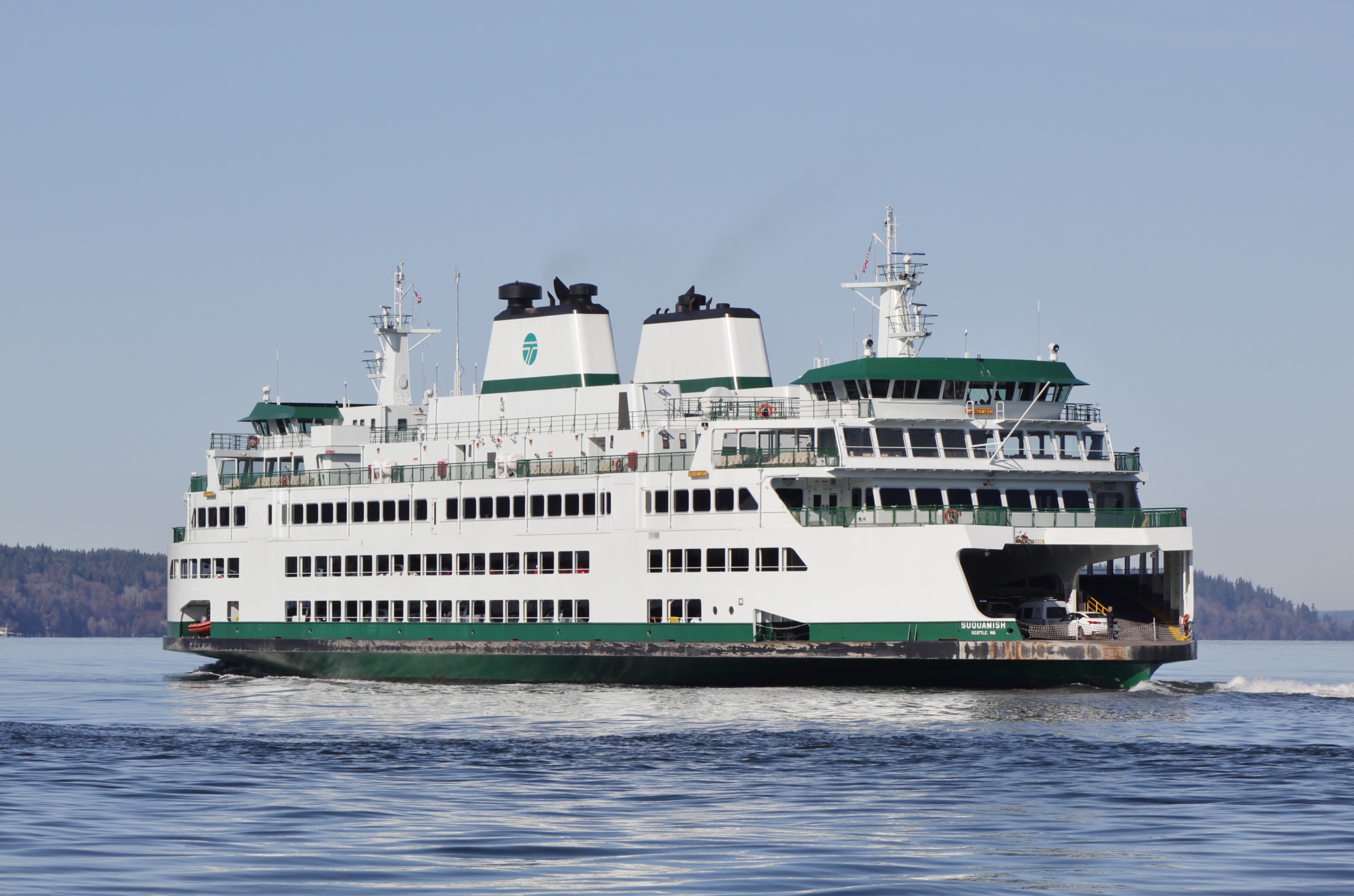
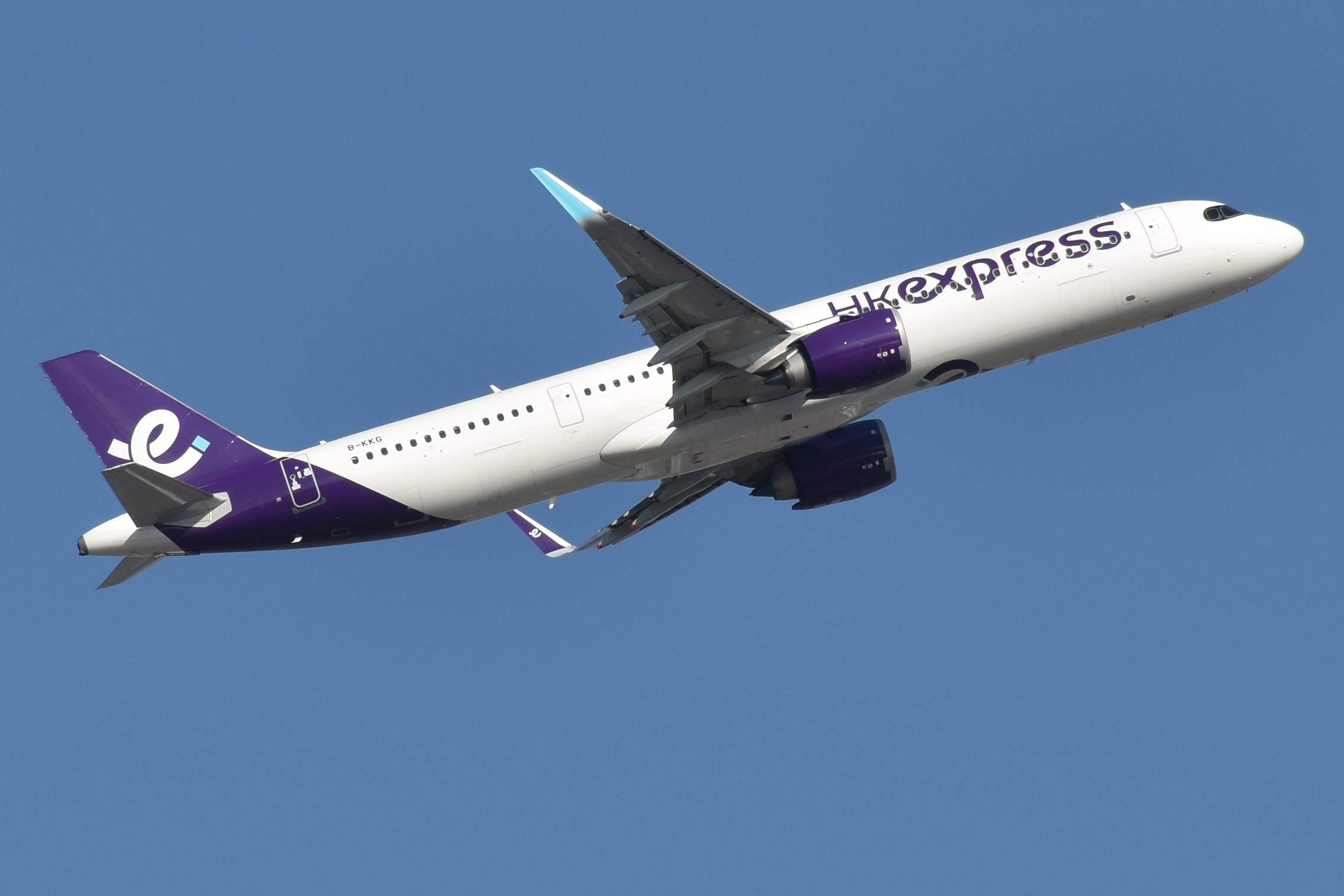
Types of public transport. Clockwise from top left: A passenger train in Japan, a bus in Perth, an airplane in Hong Kong, and a ferry in the United States.

Public transport (also known as public transportation, public transit, mass transit, or simply transit) refers to forms of transport made available for use by the general public. Public transport systems typically operate on fixed routes and schedules and charge a standardized fare intended to cover operating costs, often supplemented by public funding where required.

There is no universally fixed definition of which modes are included. While systems such as buses and railways are commonly cited, air travel is often excluded from general discussions of public transport due to its market-driven structure and competitive pricing. Common examples include city buses, trolleybuses, trams (or light rail), rapid transit systems, passenger trains, and ferries. Intercity public transport is primarily provided by airlines, coaches, and intercity rail, with high-speed rail networks under development in several regions.

Most public transport services operate along fixed corridors with designated boarding points and published timetables, allowing for predictable operations and efficient use of infrastructure. High-frequency services often prioritize regular headways over exact departure times. However, many trips involve multimodal travel, such as walking or feeder bus services to access rail stations, highlighting the importance of network coordination and cost-effective planning.

In some regions, share taxis and other demand-responsive services provide flexible alternatives to fixed-route transit, either competing with or complementing traditional systems. Paratransit services are typically reserved for low-demand areas or passengers requiring door-to-door transportation, often at higher per-trip costs.

Public transport systems vary significantly by region due to historical, geographic, and economic factors. In Japan, many urban transit networks are operated by profit-oriented private companies, often integrated with real estate development, a model frequently cited for its financial sustainability and operational efficiency.

In the context of developing nations, empirical research indicates that the service marketing mix significantly influences customer satisfaction, which subsequently drives ridership intention in public transport systems.

In North America, mass transit is most commonly operated by municipal or regional transit authorities, typically funded through a combination of fares, local taxes, and government subsidies. In Europe, both state-owned enterprises and private operators participate in transit provision, often under competitive contracting arrangements.

For geographic and economic reasons, levels of public transport use and investment differ widely across countries. The International Association of Public Transport (UITP) serves as a global network for transit operators, policymakers, researchers, and industry stakeholders, with more than 1,900 members across over 100 countries.

== History ==
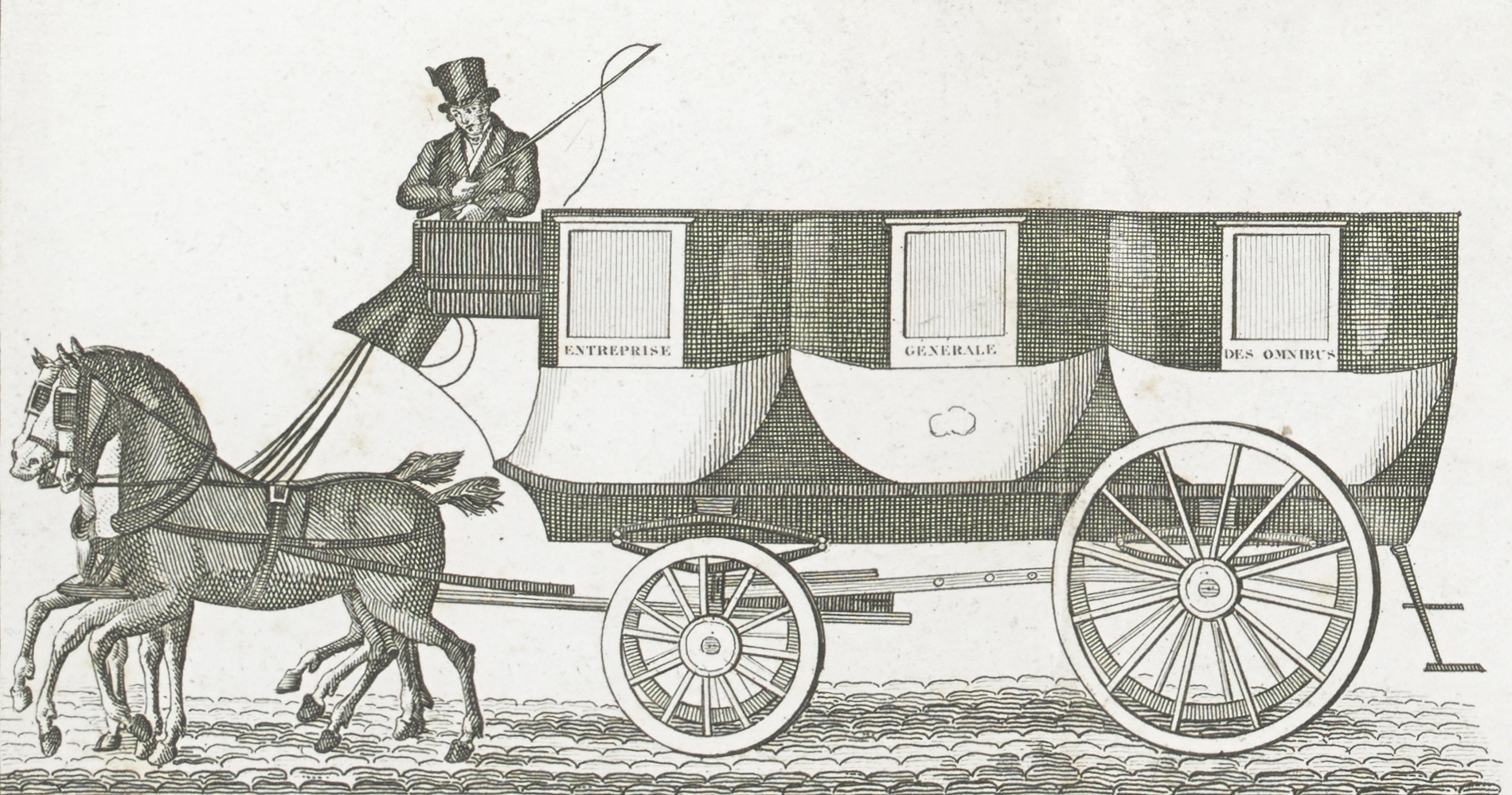
An omnibus design from 1828, Paris

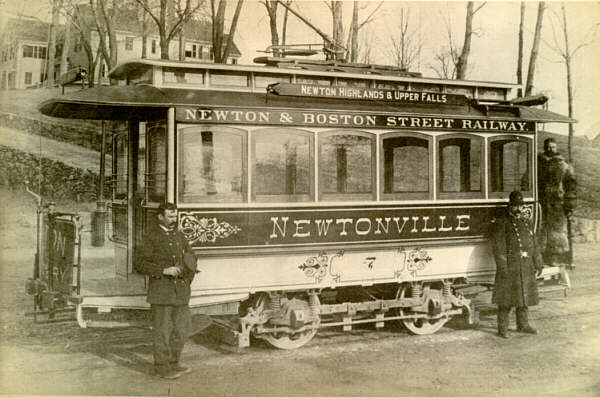
A Newton and Boston Street Railway trolley car in Newton, Massachusetts

Conveyances designed for public hire are as old as the first ferry service. The earliest public transport was water transport. Ferries appear in Greek mythology writings. The mystical ferryman Charon had to be paid and would only then take passengers to Hades.

Some historical forms of public transport include the stagecoaches traveling a fixed route between coaching inns, and the horse-drawn boat carrying paying passengers, which was a feature of European canals from the 17th century onwards. The canal itself as a form of infrastructure dates back to antiquity. In ancient Egypt canals were used for freight transportation to bypass the Aswan cataract. The Chinese also built canals for water transportation as far back as the warring States period which began in the 5th century BCE. Whether or not those canals were used for for-hire public transport remains unknown; the Grand Canal in China (begun in 486 BCE) served primarily the grain trade.

The bus, the first organized public transit system within a city, appears to have originated in Paris in 1662, although the service in question, Carrosses à cinq sols (English: five-sol coaches), which have been developed by mathematician and philosopher Blaise Pascal, lasted only fifteen years until 1677. Buses are known to have operated in Nantes in 1826. The public bus transport system was introduced to London in July 1829.

The first passenger horse-drawn vehicle opened in 1806. It ran along the Swansea and Mumbles Railway.

In 1825, George Stephenson built the Locomotion No 1 for the Stockton and Darlington Railway in northeast England, the first public steam railway in the world. The world's first steam-powered underground railway opened in London in 1863.

The first successful electric streetcar was built for 11 miles of track for the Union Passenger Railway in Tallahassee, Florida, in 1888. Electric streetcars could carry heavier passenger loads than predecessors, which reduced fares and stimulated greater transit use.

Two years after the Richmond success, over thirty-two thousand electric streetcars were operating in America. Electric streetcars also paved the way for the first subway system in America. Before electric streetcars, steam powered subways were considered. However, most people believed that riders would avoid the smoke-filled subway tunnels from the steam engines. In 1894, Boston built the first subway in the United States, an electric streetcar line in a 1.5-mile tunnel under Tremont Street's retail district. Other cities quickly followed, constructing thousands of miles of subway in the following decades.

In March 2020, Luxembourg abolished fares for trains, trams and buses and became the first country in the world to make all public transport free.

The Encyclopædia Britannica specifies that public transportation is within urban areas, but does not limit its discussion of the topic to urban areas.

== Types of public transport ==
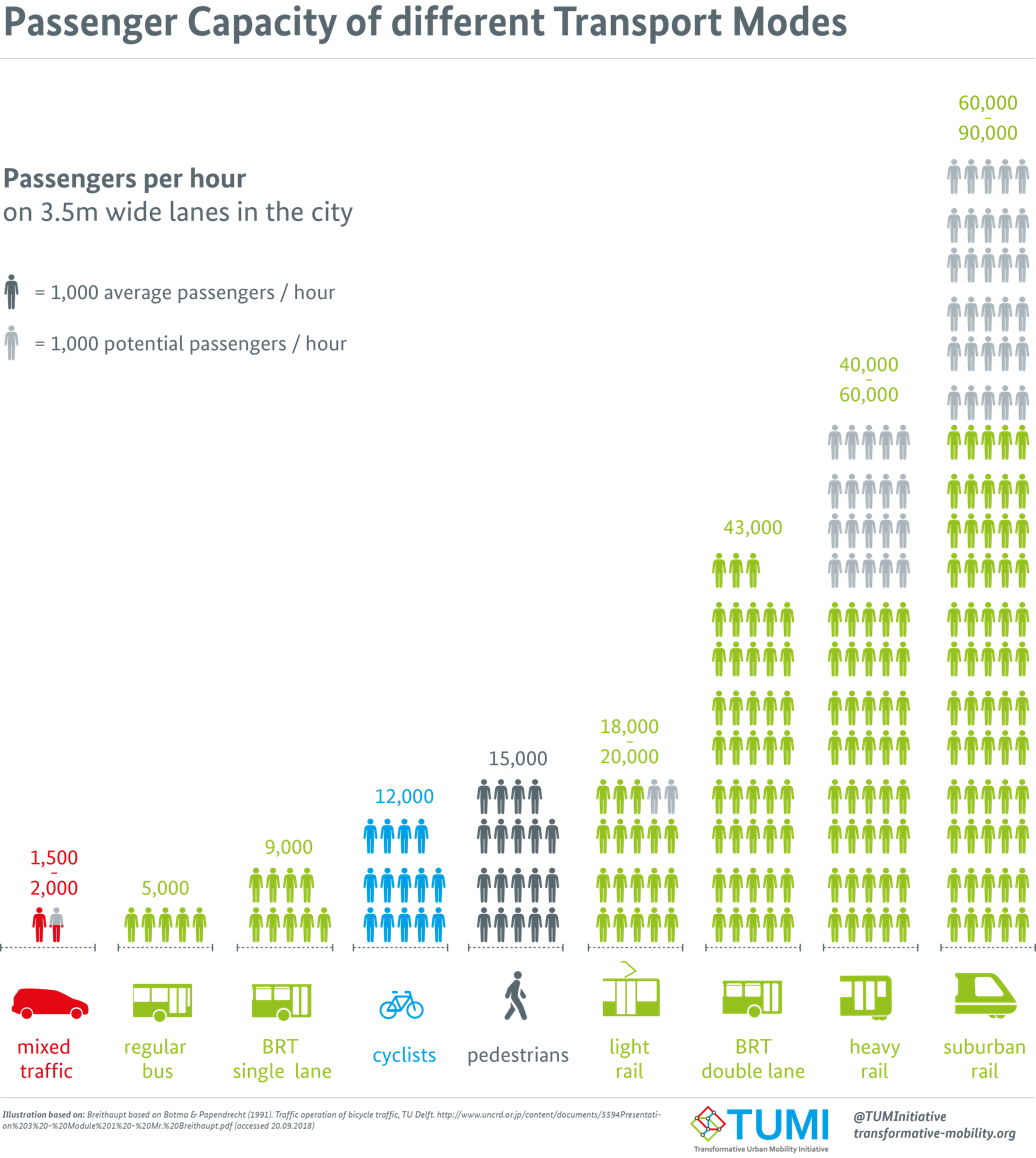
Passenger capacity of different modes of transport

=== Comparing modes ===
Seven criteria estimate the usability of different types of public transport and its overall appeal. The criteria are speed, comfort, safety, cost, proximity, timeliness and directness. Speed is calculated from total journey time including transfers. Proximity means how far passengers must walk or otherwise travel before they can begin the public transport leg of their journey and how close it leaves them to their desired destination. Timeliness is how long they must wait for the vehicle. Directness records how far a journey using public transport deviates from a passenger's ideal route.

In selecting between competing modes of transport, many individuals are strongly motivated by direct cost (travel fare/ticket price to them) and convenience, as well as being informed by habit. The same individual may accept the lost time and statistically higher risk of accident in private transport, together with the initial, running and parking costs. Loss of control, spatial constriction, overcrowding, high speeds/accelerations, height and other phobias may discourage use of public transport. The transport hub makes it easier for travellers to use different modes of transport during one trip.

Actual travel time on public transport becomes a lesser consideration when predictable and when travel itself is reasonably comfortable (seats, toilets, services), and can thus be scheduled and used pleasurably, productively or for (overnight) rest. Chauffeured movement is enjoyed by many people when it is relaxing, safe, but not too monotonous. Waiting, interchanging, stops and holdups, for example due to traffic or for security, are discomforting.

=== Airline ===
An airline provides scheduled service with aircraft between airports, the majority using airplanes. Air travel has high speeds, but incurs large waiting times before and after travel, and is therefore often only feasible over longer distances or in areas where a lack of surface infrastructure makes other modes of transport impossible. Since the 1970s, the hub-and-spoke system increased in popularity, compared to point-to-point flights. Jet lag is a human constraint discouraging frequent rapid long-distance east–west commuting.

Bush airlines work more similarly to bus stops; an aircraft waits for passengers and takes off when the aircraft is full.

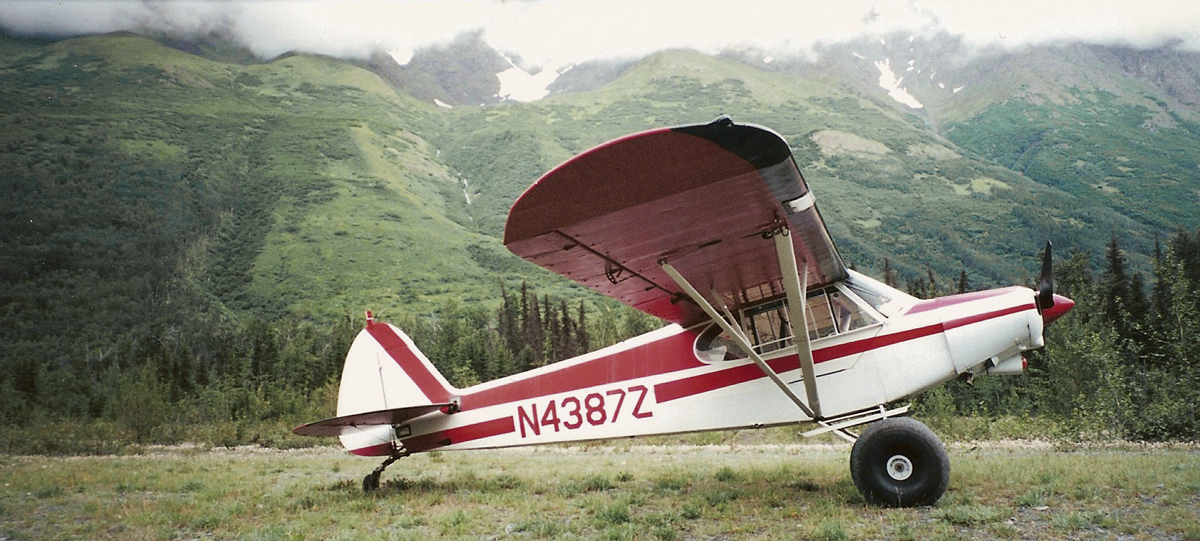
Bush plane Piper PA-18 Super Cub

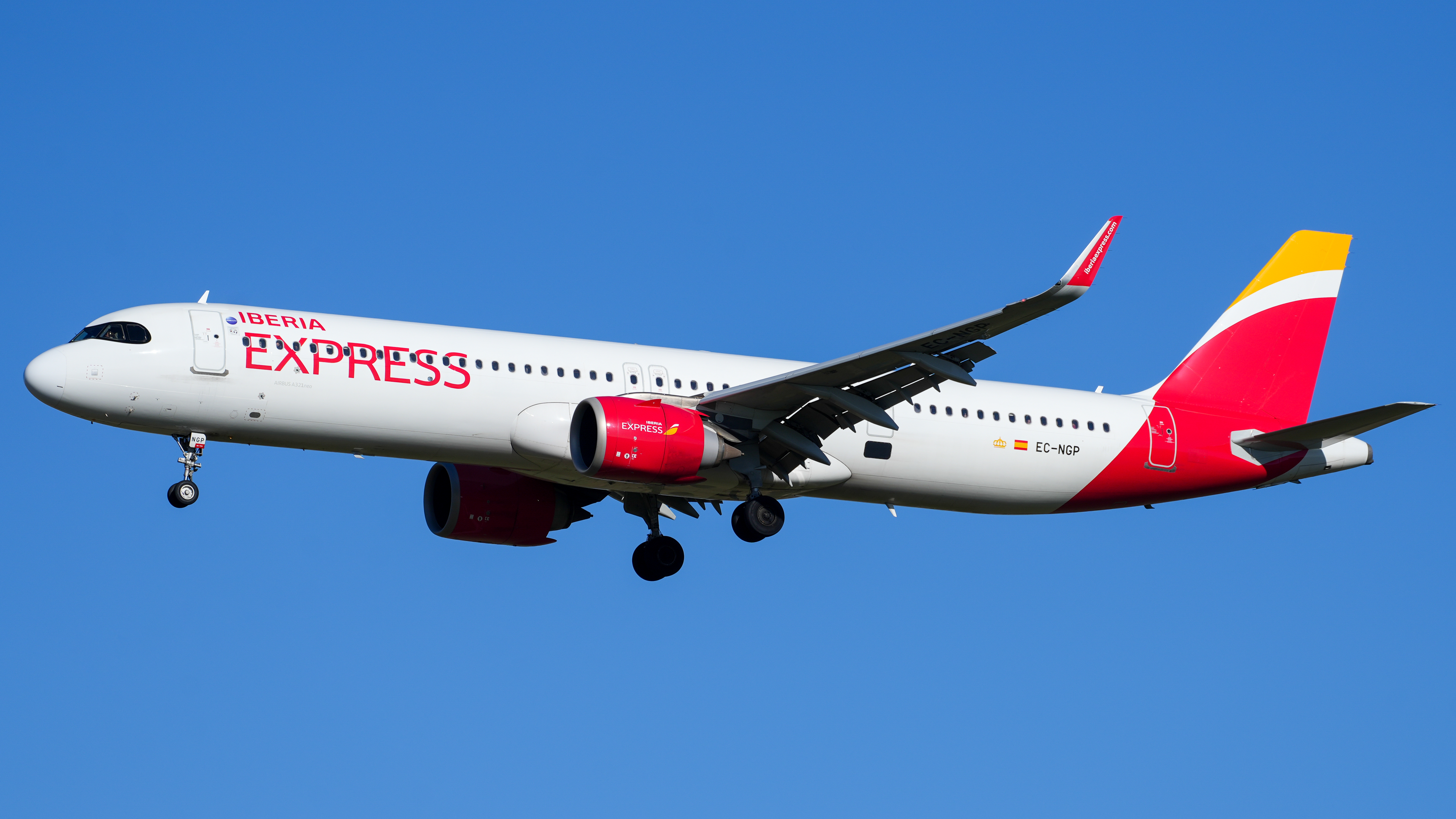
An Iberia Express Airbus A321 in 2024

=== Bus and coach ===
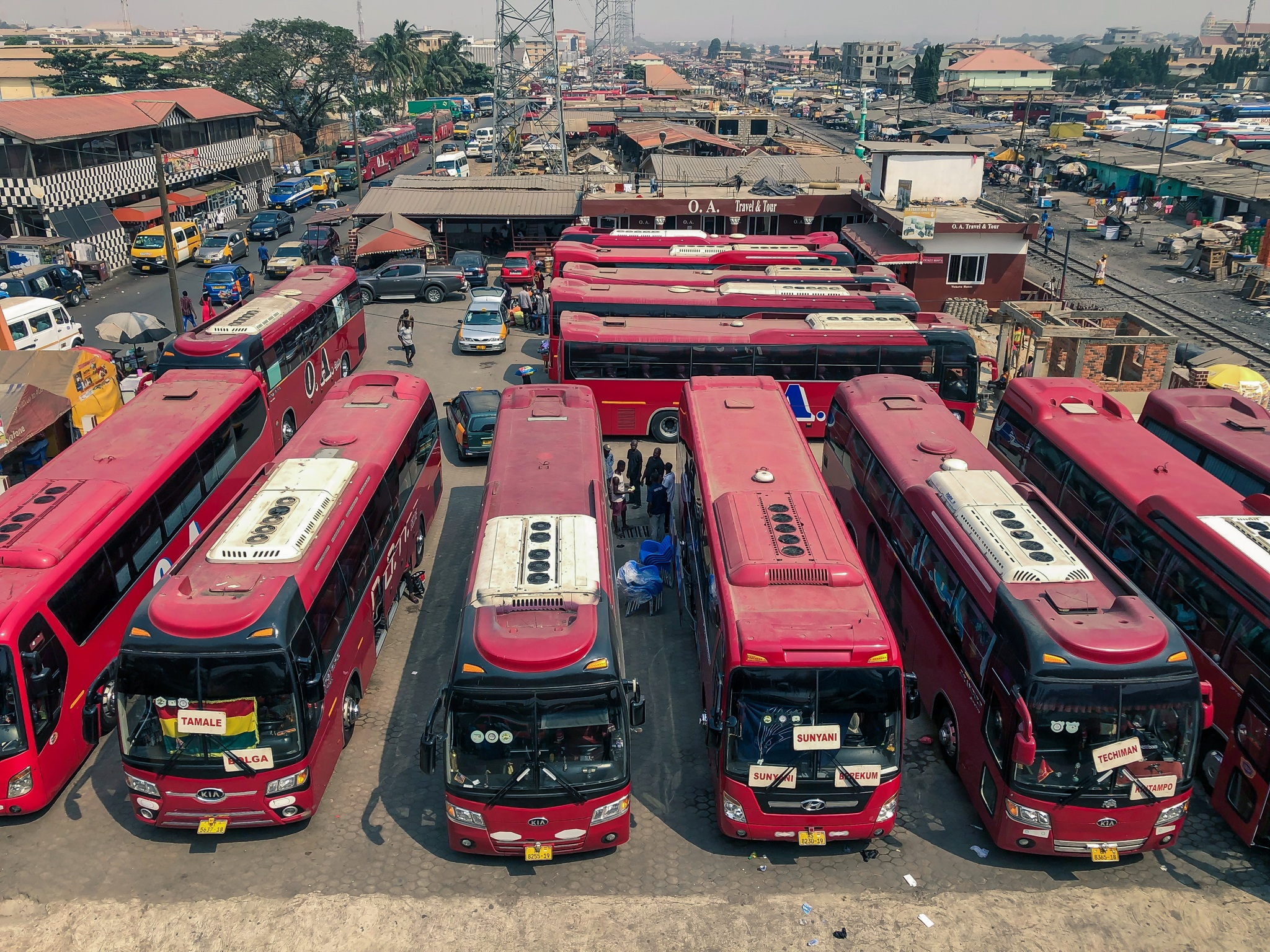
Bus station in Accra

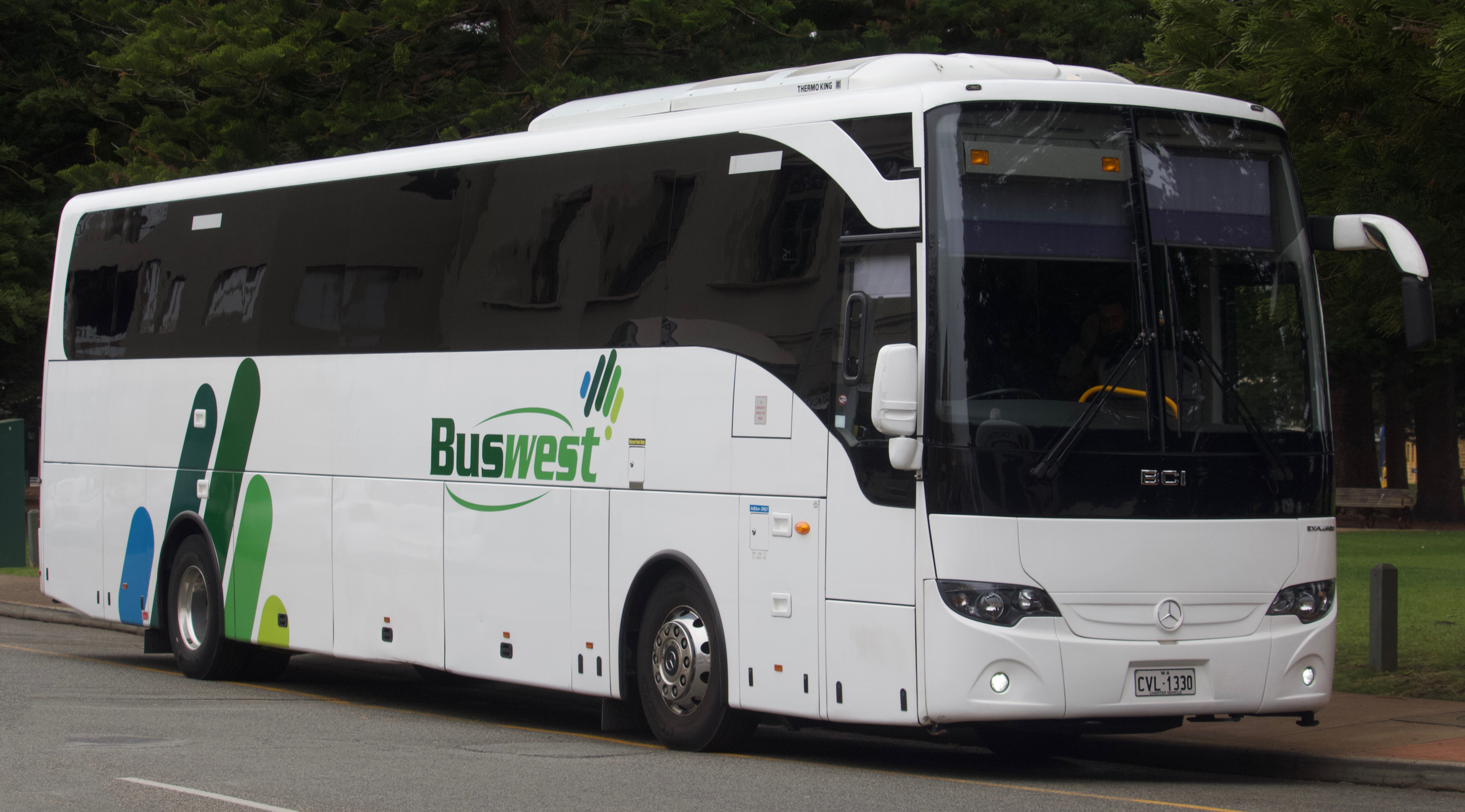
Coach

Bus services use buses on conventional roads to carry numerous passengers on shorter journeys. Buses operate with a relatively low capacity compared with trams, light rail, or trains, and can operate on conventional roads, with relatively inexpensive bus stops to serve passengers. Therefore, buses are commonly used in smaller cities, towns, and rural areas, and for shuttle services (e.g. to the airport) supplementing other means of transit in large cities. Midibuses have an ever lower capacity, however double decker buses, articulated buses and bi-articulated buses have a slightly larger capacity.

Intercity bus service use coaches (long-distance buses) for suburb-to-CBD or longer-distance transportation. The vehicles are normally equipped with more comfortable seating, a separate luggage compartment, video and possibly also a toilet. They have higher standards than city buses, but a limited stopping pattern.

Certain types of buses, styled after old-style streetcars, are also called trackless trolleys, but are built on the same platforms as a typical diesel, CNG, or hybrid bus; these are more often used for tourist rides than commuting and tend to be privately owned. Similarly, trackless trains are often used for moving tourists between sights, often at beach resorts, or visitors within amusement parks, among others.

In recent years, the world has significantly shifted toward sustainability and eco-conscious systems. This involves the deployment of technology and the large-scale integration of electric vehicles (EVs). According to the International Finance Corporation (IFC), the transition to electric buses represents a critical frontier in transportation engineering. This transition requires engineers to redesign power grids and depot logistics to accommodate charging demands while balancing the high upfront costs of zero-emission fleets against long-term operational savings. However, although buses contribute to a little percent of overall road travel, their frequent usage rate makes them a notable contributor to GHG emissions. The Environmental Protection Agency (EPA) affirms that transitioning to buses with zero emissions can reduce the outflow of greenhouse gases by 65% when compared to the regular fossil fuel powered buses. It is no news the harmful effects these greenhouse gases have on the environment at large. Their harmful impacts span across the atmosphere, Biosphere, lithosphere, and the hydrosphere.

As reliance on battery and fossil fuels powered buses and transport systems as a whole continues to drop and transitions to renewable energy continue to take place, environmental remediation can be achieved. Furthermore, to achieve a net zero emissions rate by 2050, a quota of over 75% electric bus sales should be achieved by 2030. This has brought about a huge global market, with these energy or electric buses being sold by manufacturers on B2B platforms such as Alibaba.

Coaches and trains are not left out in this technological advancement; electric coaches are currently used widely in Europe and Asia. On the other hand, some regions rely on diesel-electric coaches that make use of fossil fuel and electricity for locomotion. Although the diesel-electric engines are not purely sustainable and might not look like a complete development, it's an improvement of the already existing traditional system.

=== Trolleybus and electric buses ===
Trolleybuses are electrically powered buses that receive power from overhead power line by way of a set of trolley poles for mobility. Online Electric Vehicles are buses that run on a conventional battery, but are recharged frequently at certain points via underground wires.

Electric buses can store the needed electrical energy on board, or be fed mains electricity continuously from an external source such as overhead lines. The majority of buses using on-board energy storage are battery electric buses (which is what this article mostly deals with), where the electric motor obtains energy from an onboard battery pack.

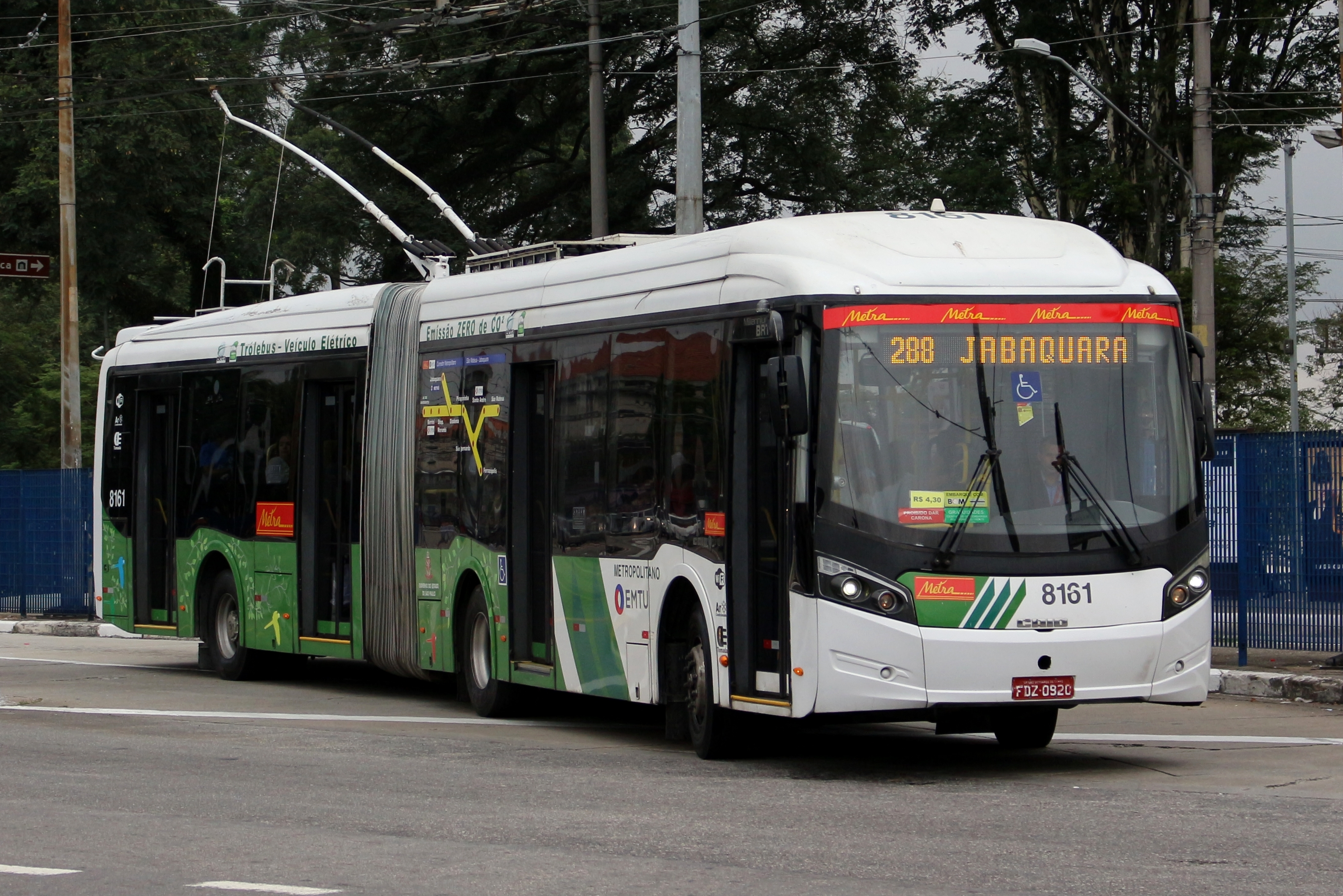
Busscar trolleybus serving in São Paulo

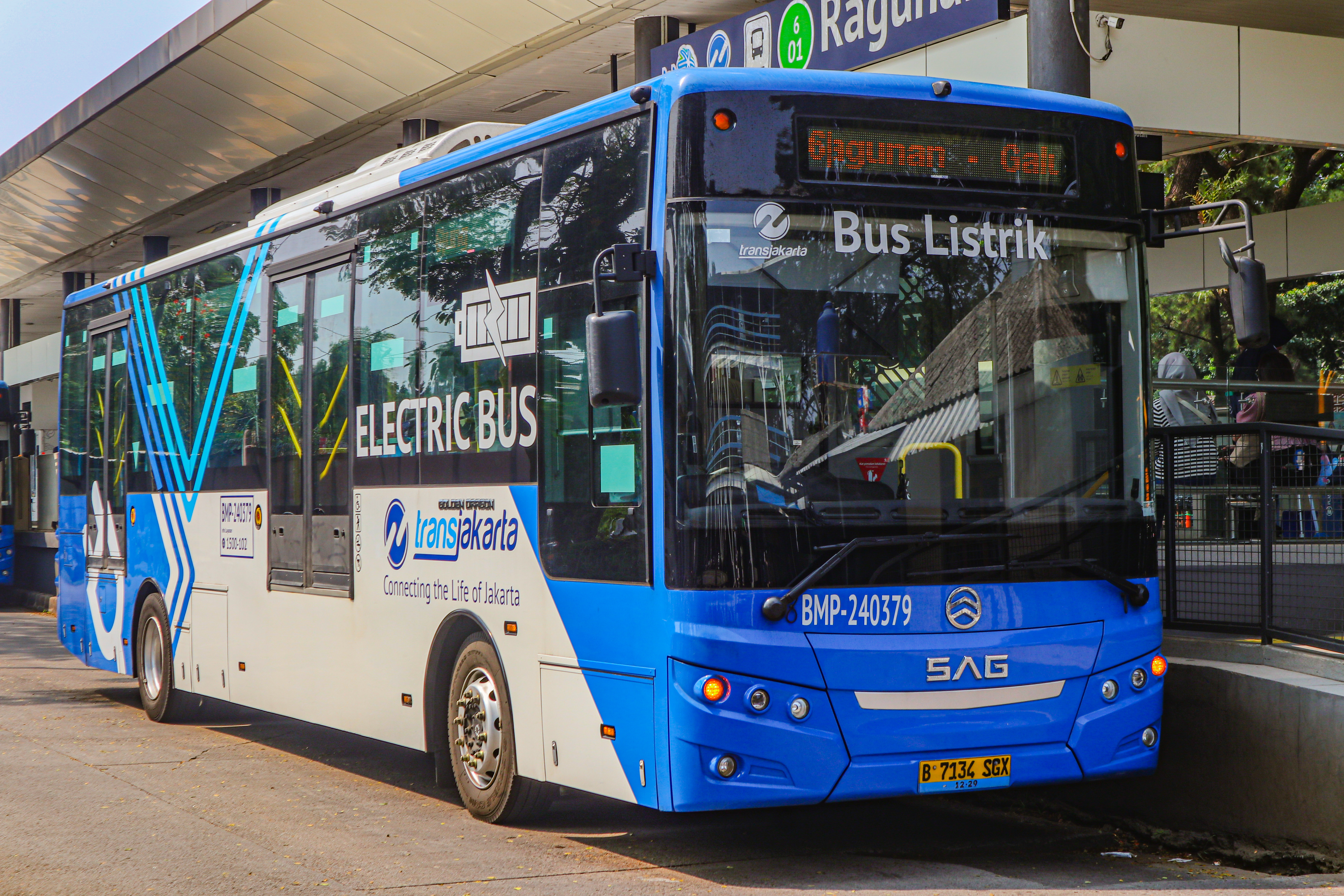
Transjakarta electric bus for bus rapid transit system serving in Jakarta

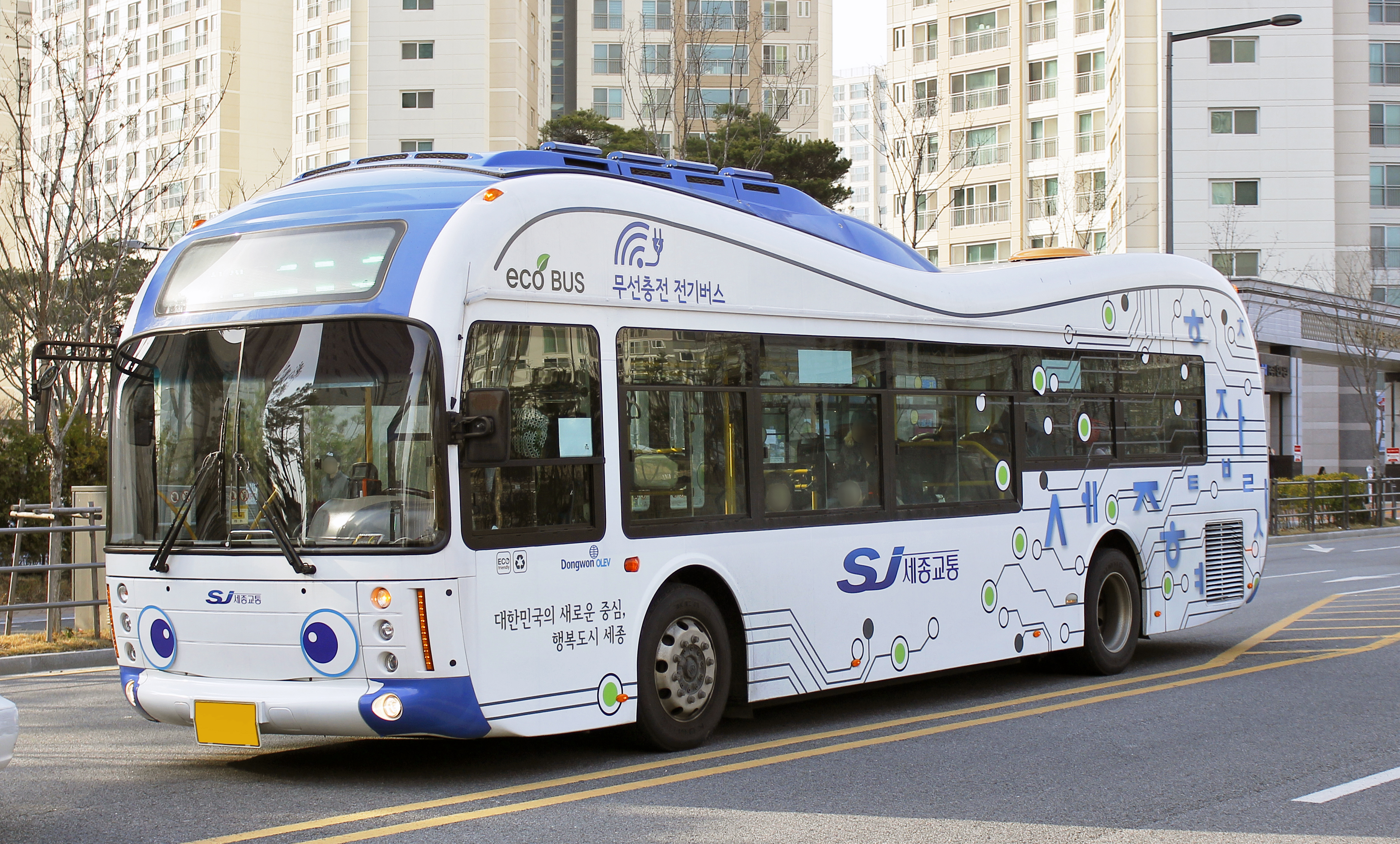
Olev online electric bus system in Daejeon

=== Bus rapid transit and guided busway ===
Bus rapid transit (BRT) is a term used for buses operating on a dedicated right-of-way, much like a light rail; resulting in a higher capacity and operating speed compared to regular buses.

A guided bus is capable of being steered by external means, usually on a dedicated track or roll way that excludes other traffic, permitting the maintenance of schedules even during rush hours.

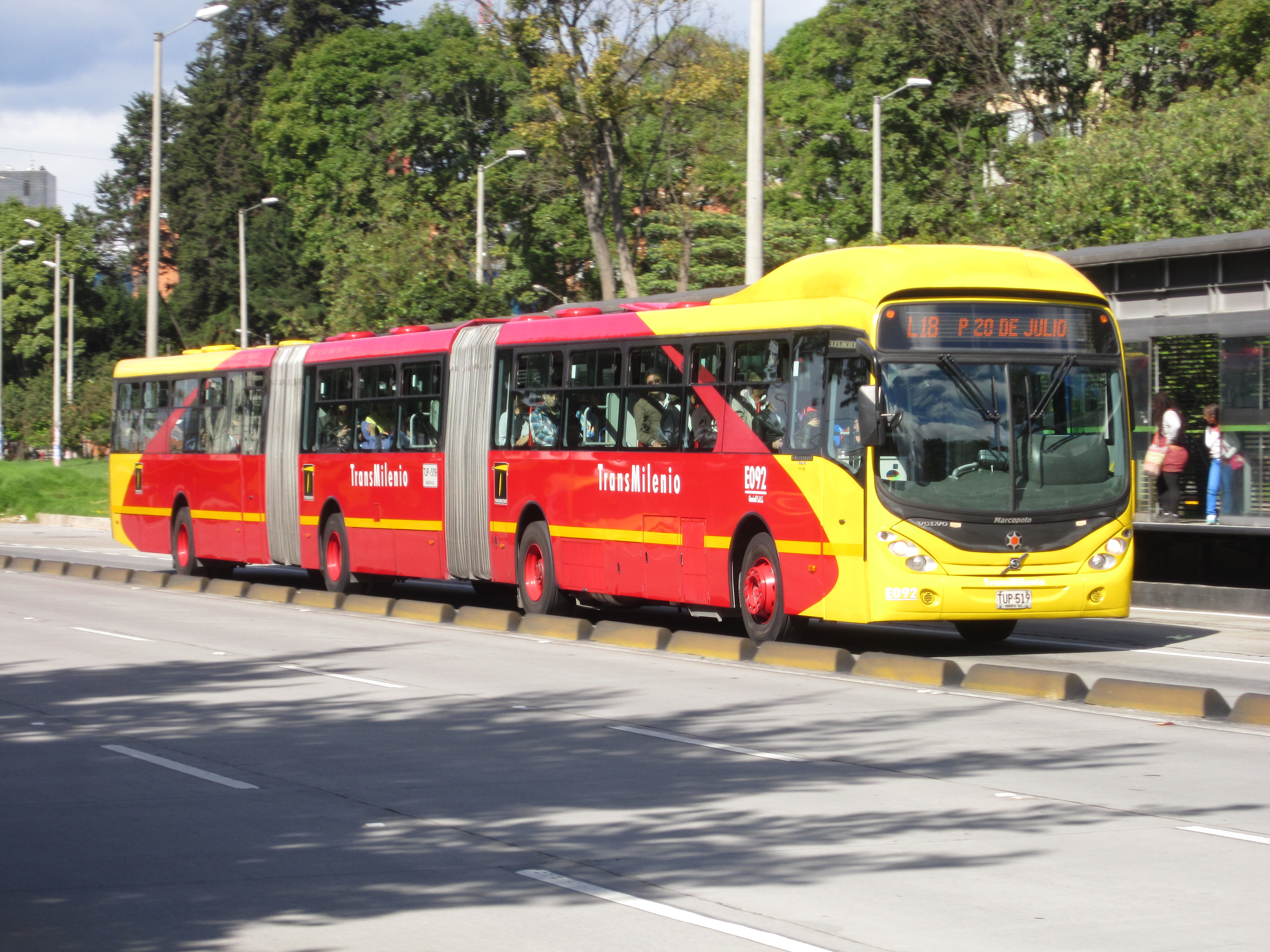
Articulated Transmilenio bus for the bus rapid transit system in Bogotá

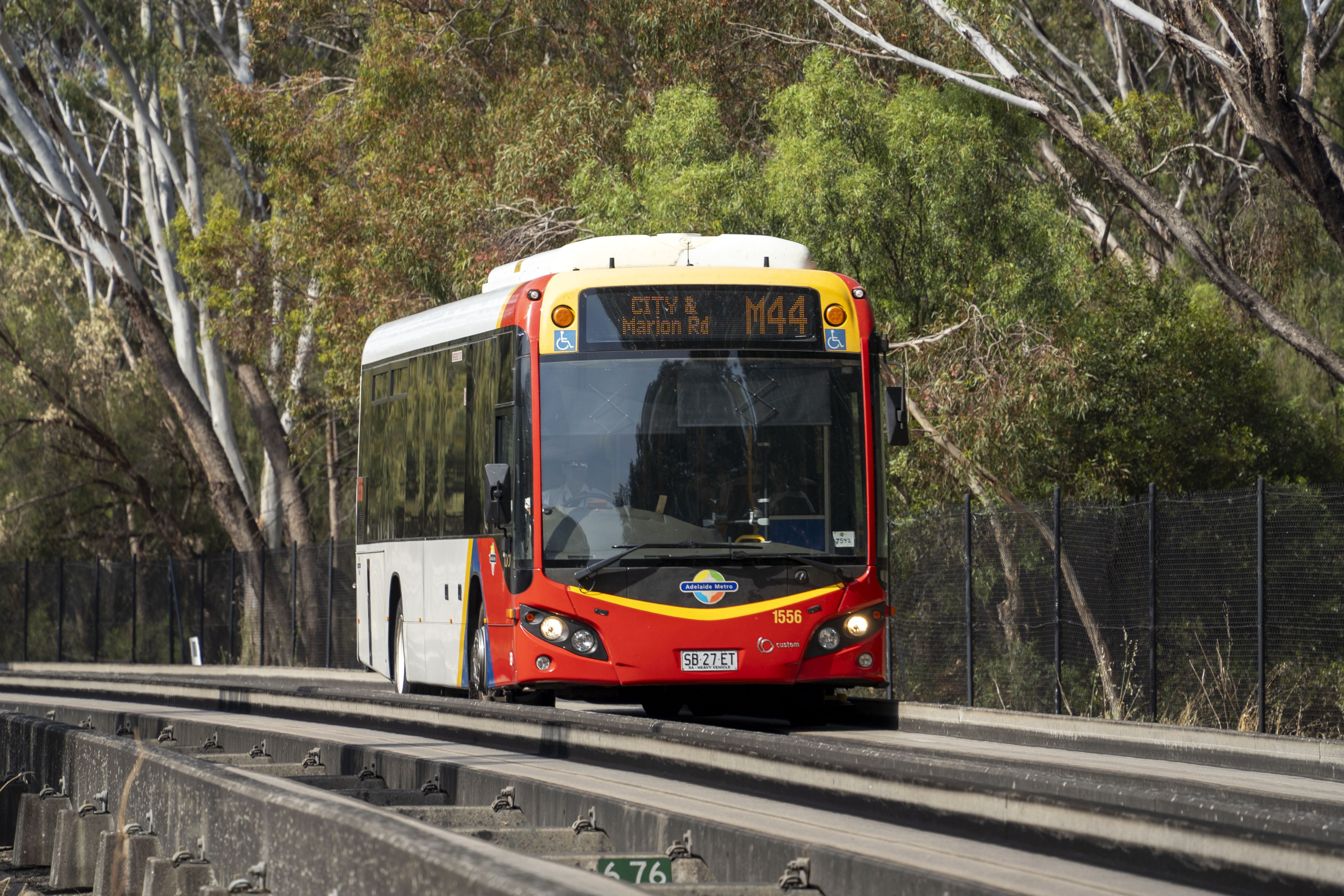
A O-Bahn Busway bus in Adelaide, on the guided busway

=== Rail ===
Passenger rail transport is the conveyance of passengers by means of wheeled vehicles specially designed to run on railways. Trains allow high capacity at most distance scales, but require track, signalling, stations and other infrastructure (e.g. electric cables) to be built and maintained, resulting in high upfront costs. Passenger rail is used on long distances (even crossing national borders), within regions and in various ways in urban environments. In many European countries, operators use specific train categories to distinguish between services. Rail travel is very popular in Japan (118 billion km (73 billion mi) per inhabitant and year in 2009) and Switzerland (2,505 km (1,557 mi) per inhabitant and year in 2019).

Heritage trains (often operating on heritage railways) and luxury trains are tourism-oriented rail services carrying passengers over scenic and/or historic routes.

=== Inter-city and high-speed rail ===
Inter-city rail is long-haul passenger services that connect multiple urban areas. They have few stops, and aim at high average speeds, typically only making one of a few stops per city. These services may also be international, including overnight trains with sleeping cars or couchettes.

High-speed rail is passenger trains operating significantly faster than conventional rail—typically defined as at least 200 kilometres per hour (120 mph). The most predominant systems have been built in Europe and East Asia (China, Japan), and compared with air travel, offer long-distance rail journeys as quick as air services, have lower prices to compete more effectively and use electricity instead of combustion. While East Asian countries have excelled at high-speed rail, the Southeast Asian countries are laggards. Trains that are faster than conventional trains but slower than high-speed trains are sometimes referred to as higher-speed trains.

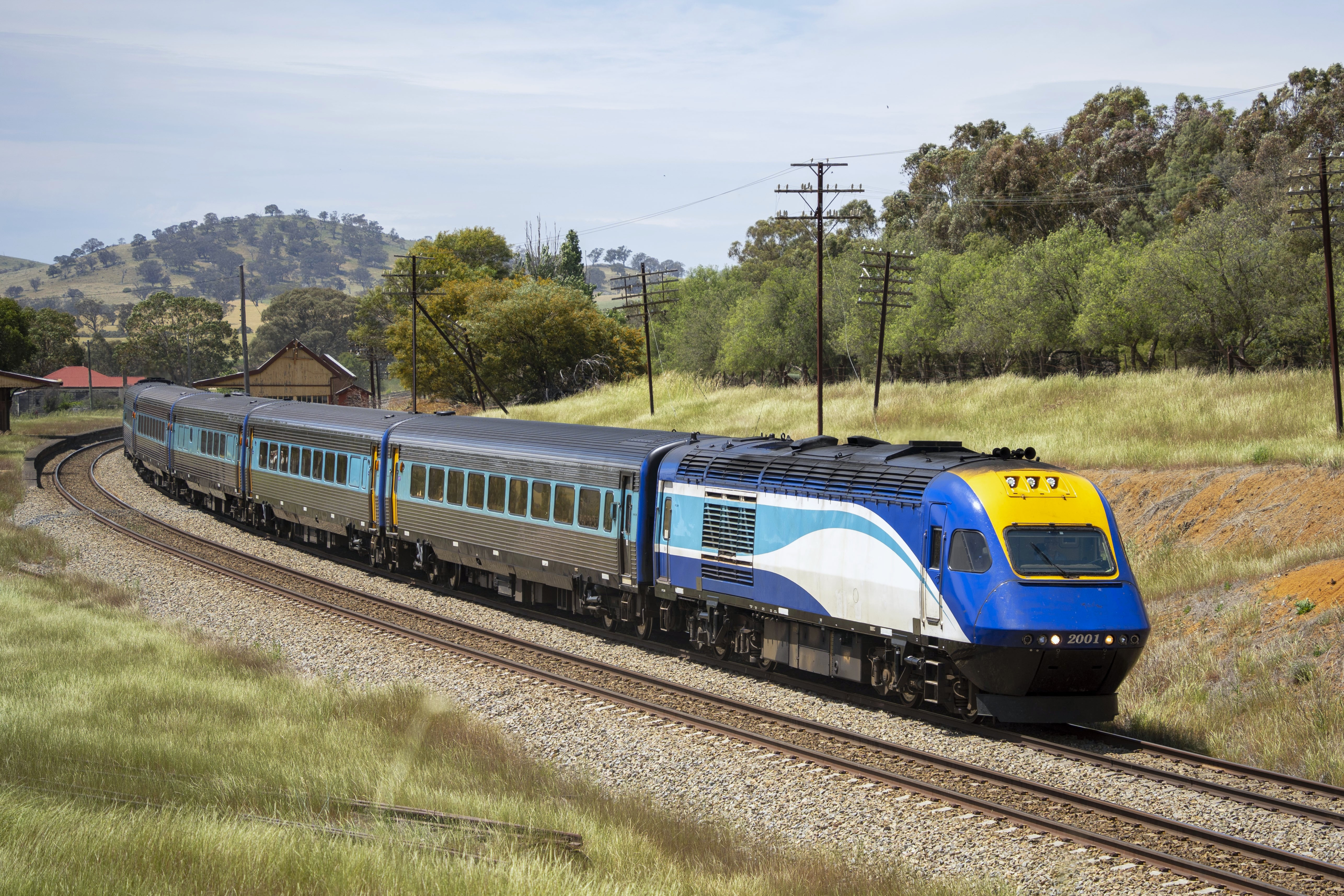
New South Wales XPT intercity rail in Galong, New South Wales

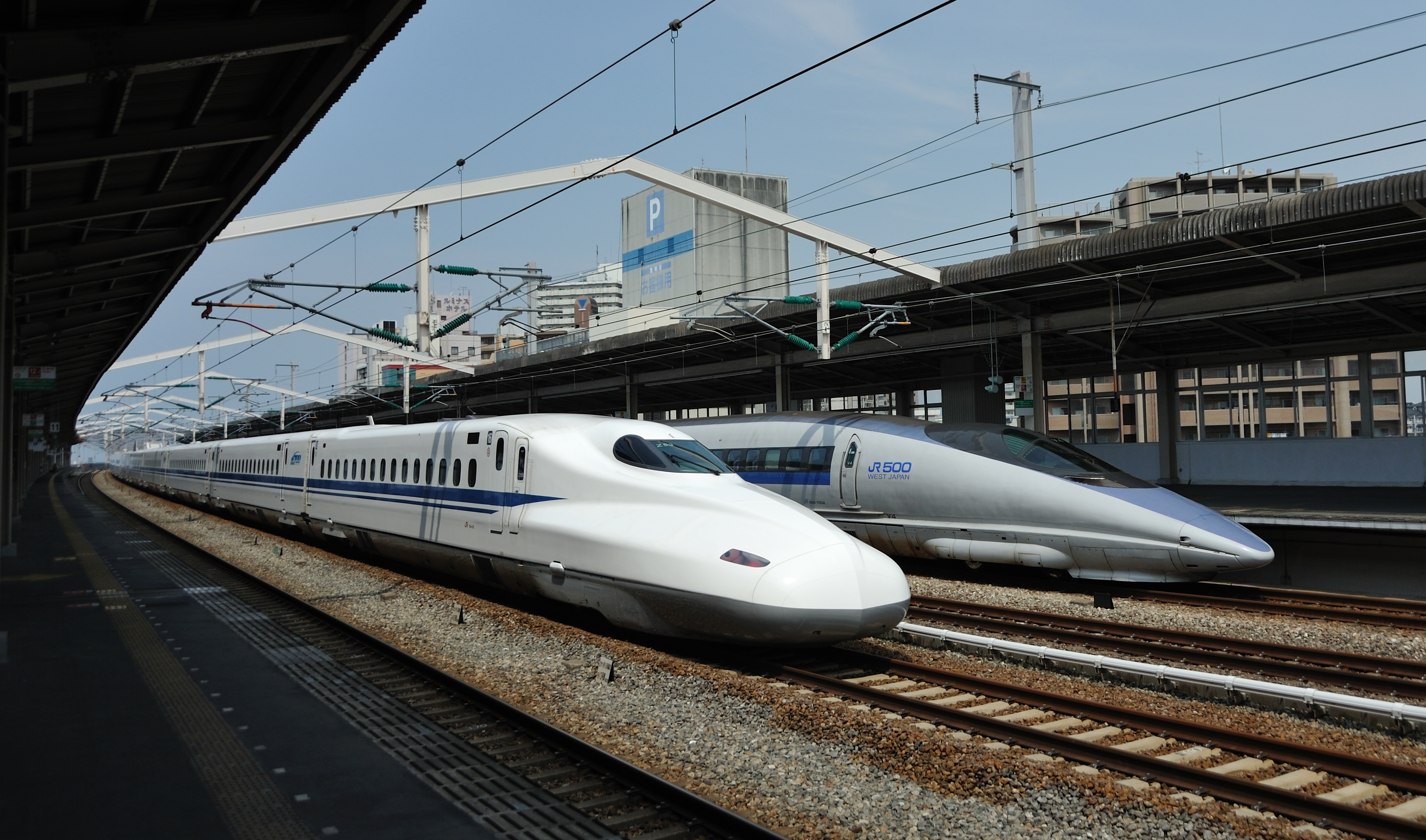
Two types of Shinkansen high-speed trains in Japan

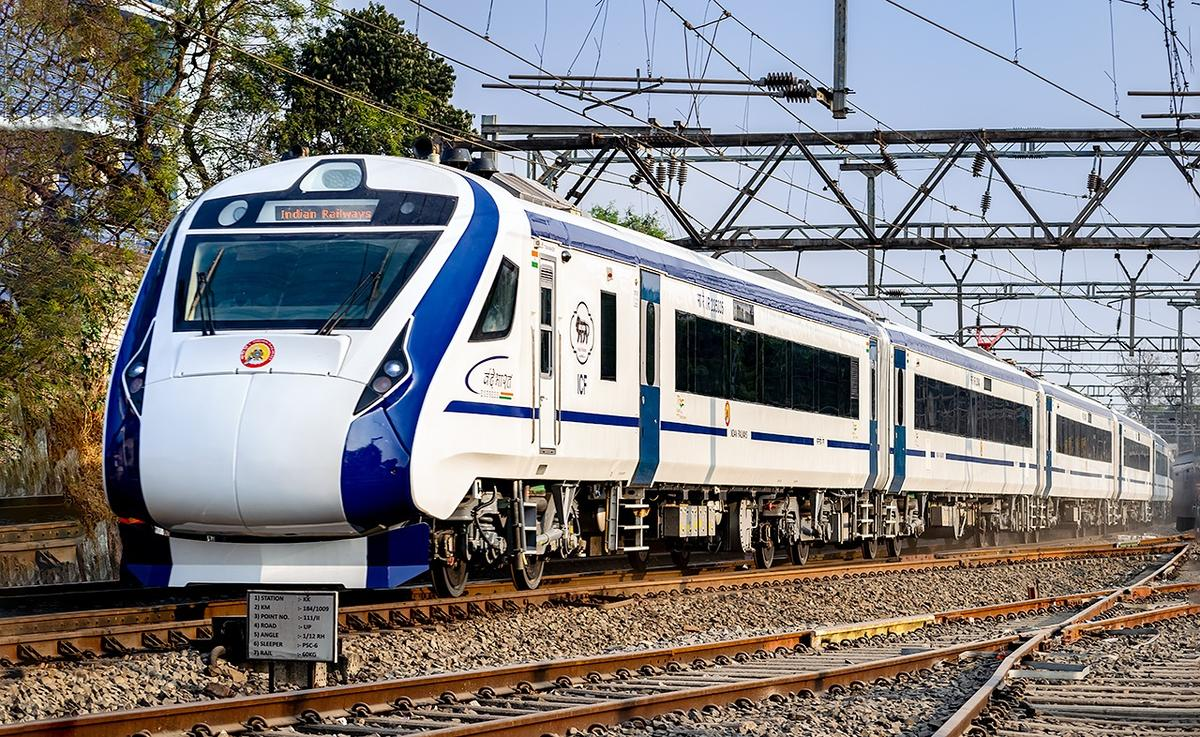
Vande Bharat Express near Chennai, Tamil Nadu Higher-speed rail

=== Urban rail transit ===
Urban rail transit is an all-encompassing term for various types of local rail systems, such as for example trams, light rail, rapid transit, people movers, commuter rail, monorail, suspension railways and funiculars.

=== Commuter and regional rail ===
Commuter rail is part of an urban area's public transport. It provides faster services to outer suburbs and neighboring satellite cities. Trains stop at stations that are located to serve a smaller suburban or town center. The stations are often combined with shuttle bus or park and ride systems, and may also be equipped with bicycle parkings or stations. Frequency may be up to several times per hour, and commuter rail systems may either be part of the national railway or operated by local transit agencies.

Common forms of commuter rail employ either diesel electric locomotives, or electric multiple unit trains. They typically use single-level railroad cars, which allow for faster boarding/deboarding times, though some systems also use bilevel rail cars. Some commuter train lines share a railway with freight trains.

Regional rail links towns and villages with each other. They typically run on an hourly or half-hourly basis and call at every station. At larger train stations, connections to long-distance trains are commonly offered. Some S-Bahn systems in German-speaking countries are comparable to regional trains. Some regional trains operate in mountainous areas.

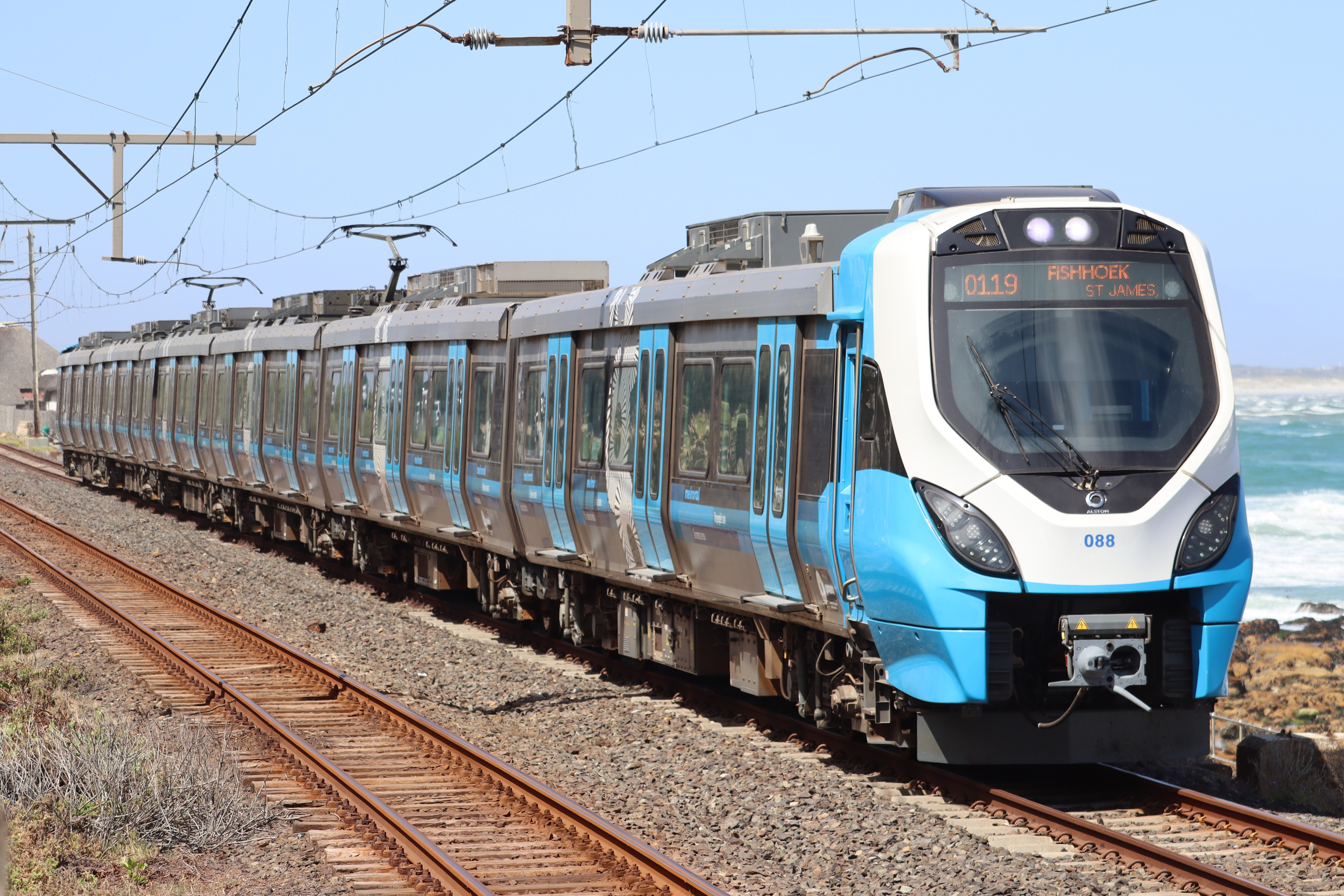
Metrorail train in Cape Town

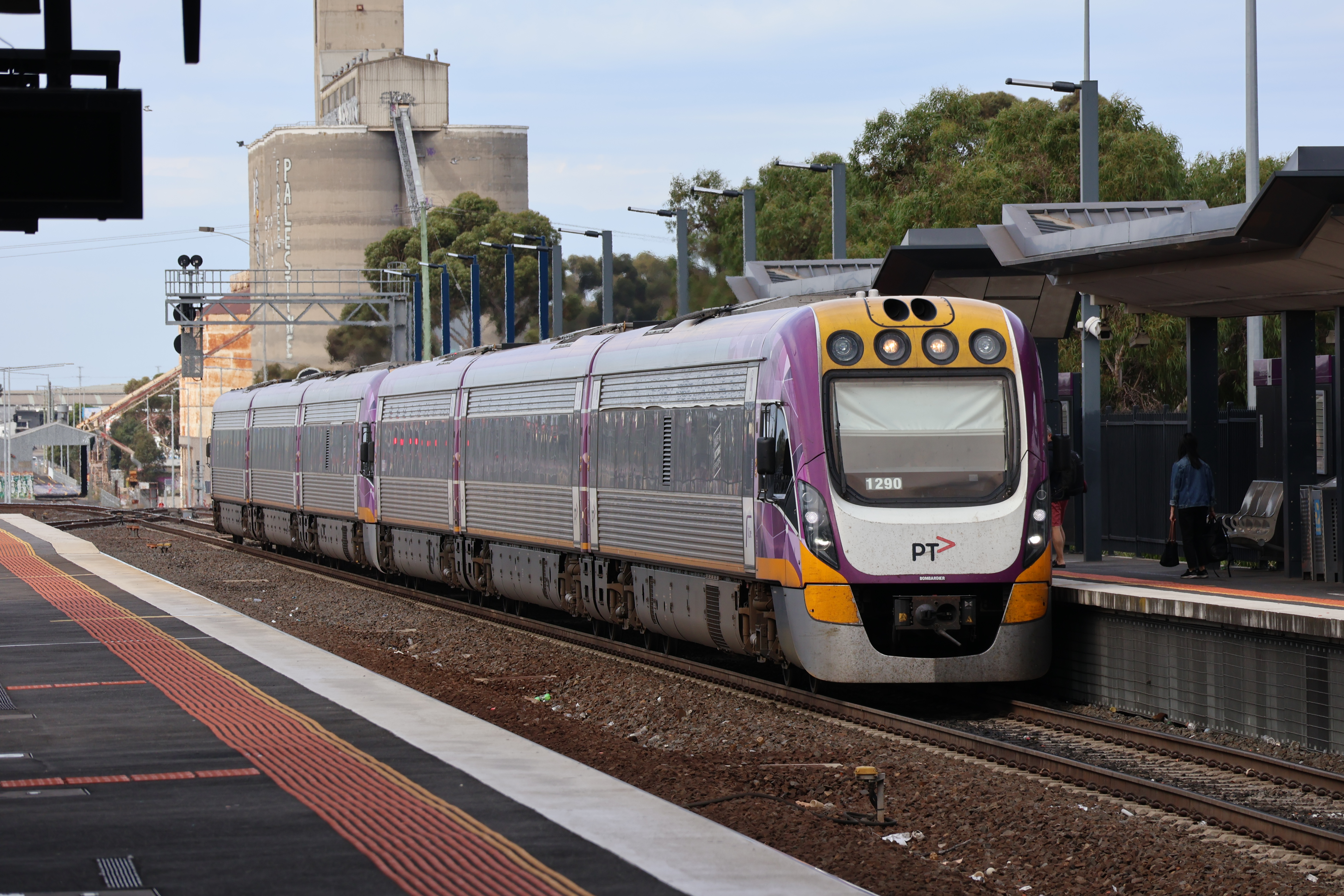
V/Line regional rail in Victoria

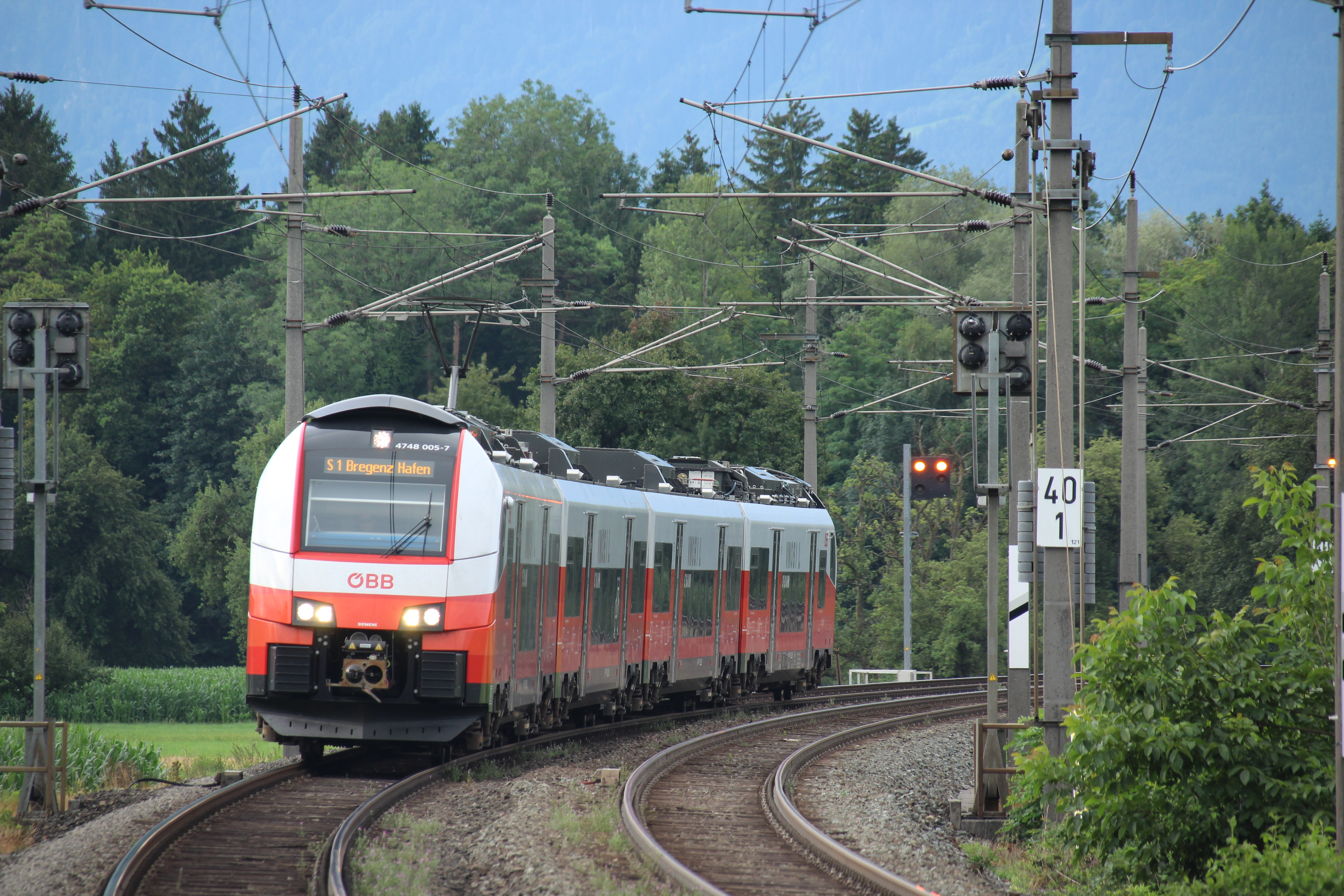
Regional S-Bahn train in Vorarlberg

=== Rapid transit and light metro ===
A Metro rapid transit (MRT) railway system (also called a metro, underground, heavy rail, or subway) operates in an urban area with high capacity and frequency, and grade separation from other traffic. Heavy rail is a high-capacity form of rail transit, with 4 to 10 units forming a train, and can be the most expensive form of transit to build. Modern heavy rail systems are mostly driverless, which allows for higher frequencies and less maintenance cost.

Systems are able to transport large numbers of people quickly over short distances with little land use. Variations of rapid transit include people movers, small-scale light metro and the commuter rail hybrid S-Bahn (see also U-Bahn). More than 160 cities have rapid transit systems, totalling more than 8,000 km (4,971 mi) of track and 7,000 stations. Twenty-five cities have systems under construction.

Medium-capacity rail system (MCS) also including light metro, is light capacity rapid transit compared to typical heavy-rail rapid transit. MCS trains are usually 1 to 4 cars. Most medium-capacity rail systems are automated or use light-rail type vehicles.

Automated guideway transit (AGT) system is a type of fixed guideway transit infrastructure with a riding or suspension track that supports and physically guides one or more driverless vehicles along its length.

Some rapid transit systems use rubber-tyred trains instead of conventional rails.

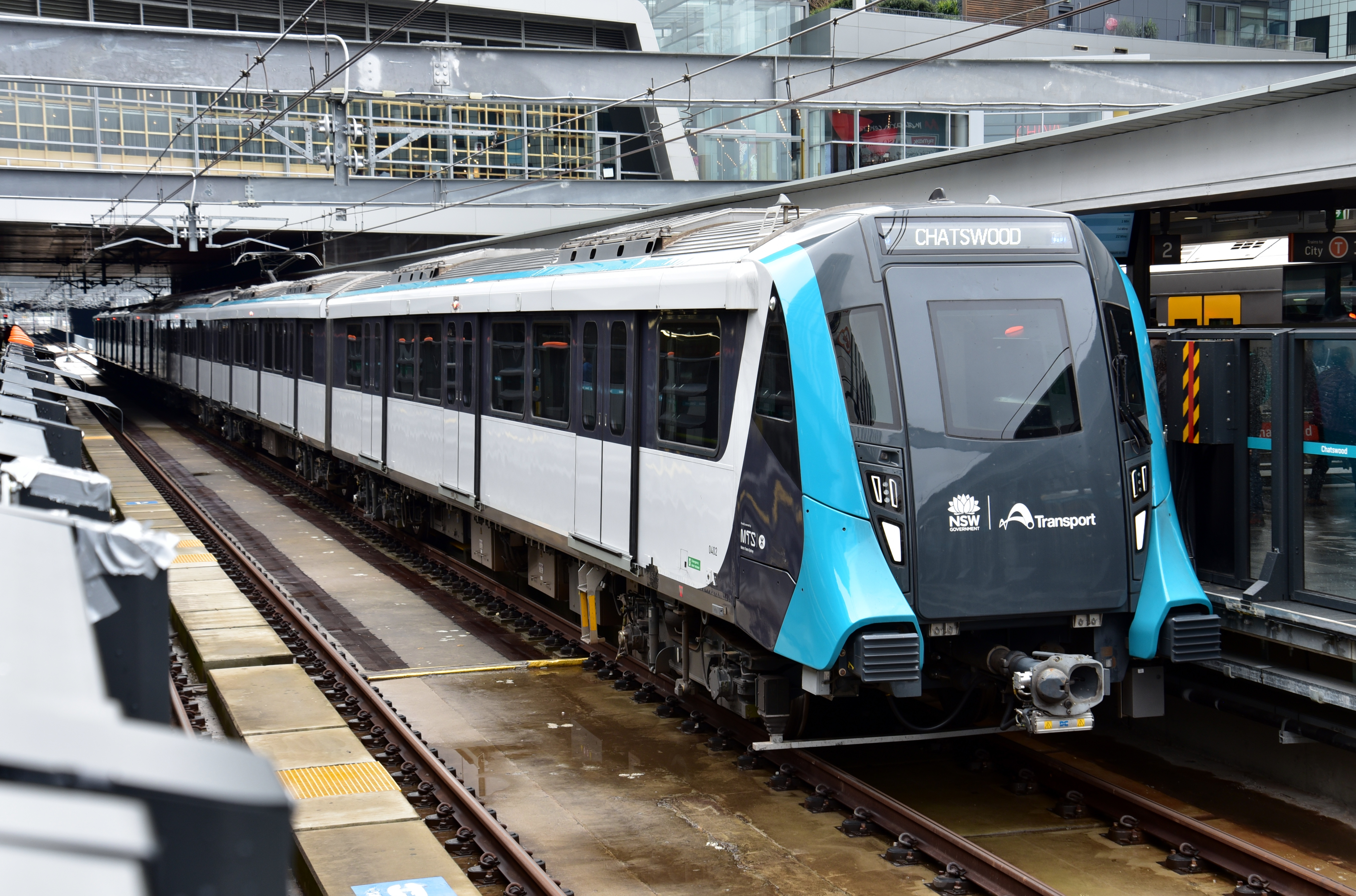
An automated rapid transit of Sydney Metro train in Sydney, Australia

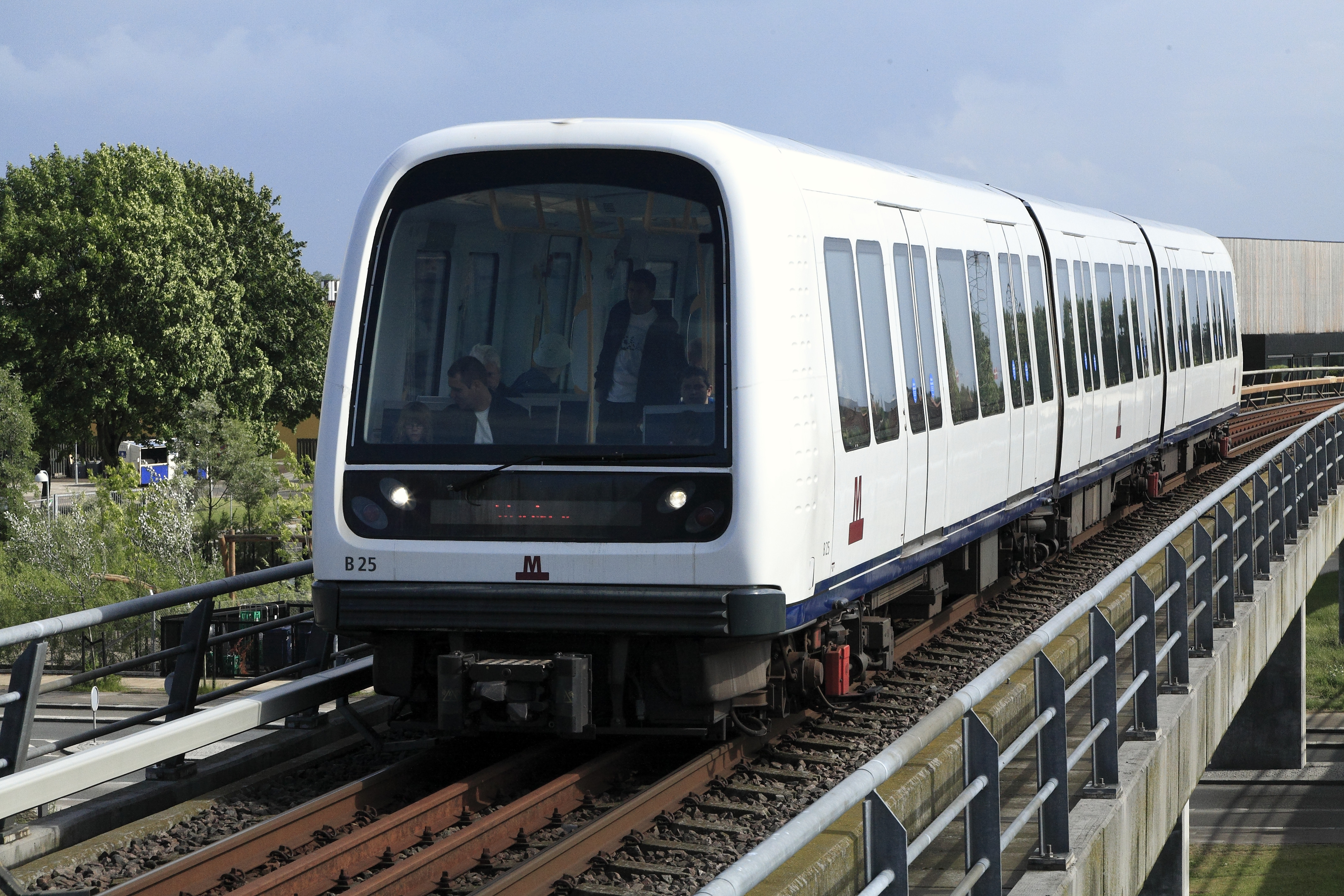
Light metro train in Copenhagen

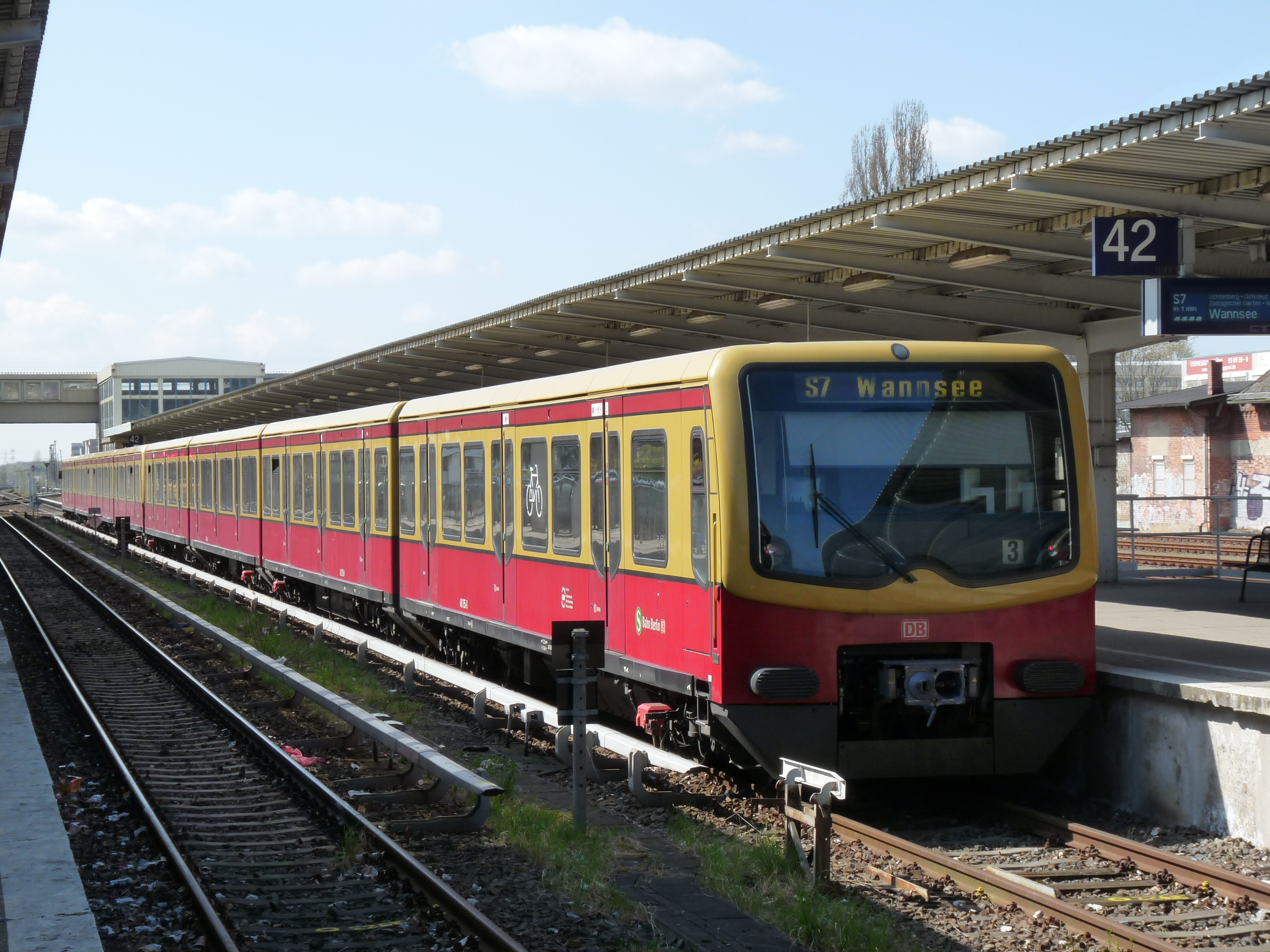
S-Bahn train in Berlin

=== Light rail transit ===
Light rail transit (LRT) is a term coined in 1972 and uses mainly tram technology. Light rail has mostly dedicated right-of-ways and less sections shared with other traffic and usually step-free access. A light rail line is generally traversed with increased speed compared to a tram line. Light rail lines are, thus, essentially modernized interurbans. Unlike trams, light rail trains are often longer and have one to four cars per train. In some cases, trams are also considered part of the light rail family.

Special light rail variants are tramtrains (see also Karlsruhe model), premetros (designed for later conversion to rapid transit) or the Stadtbahn in Germany.

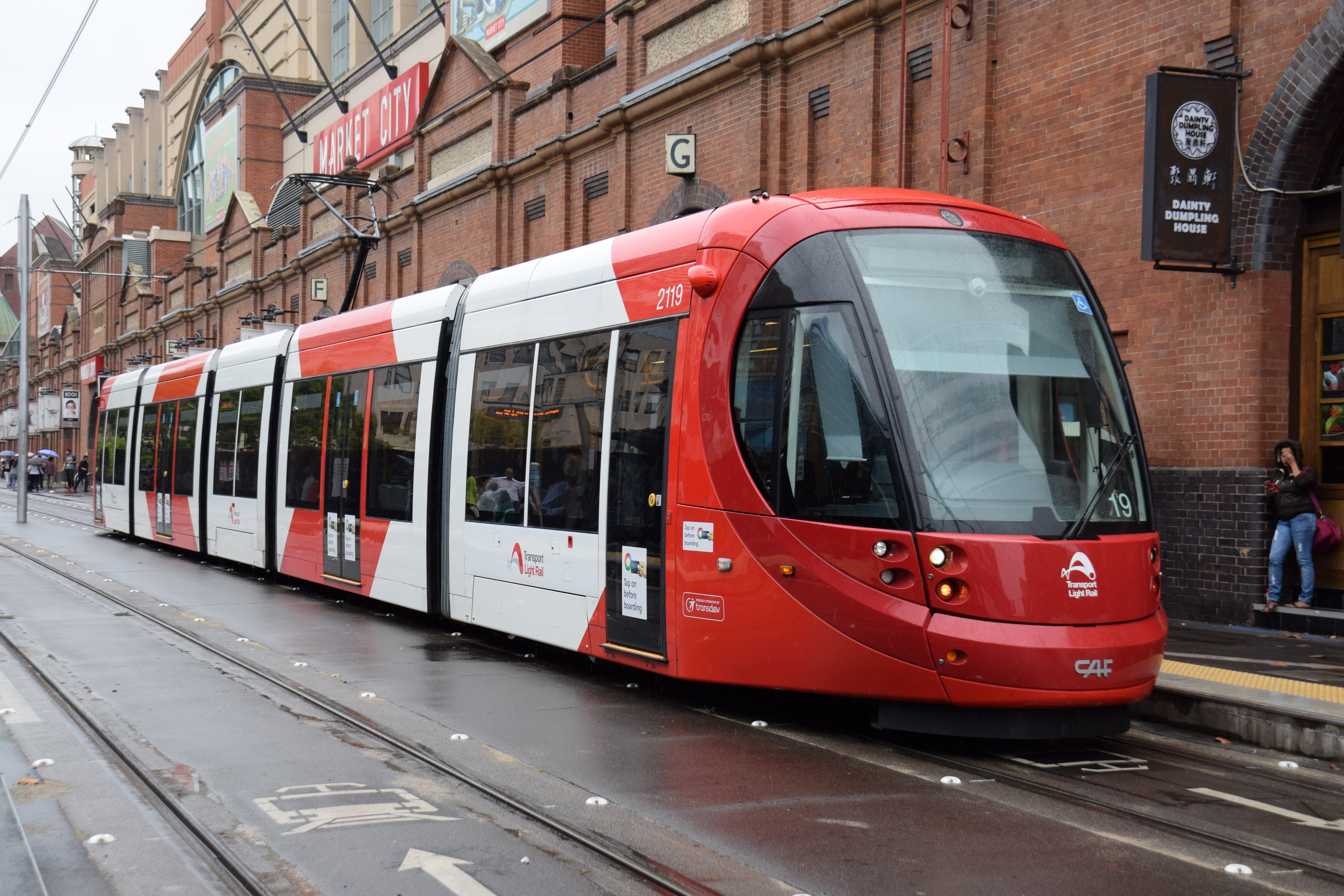
Light Rail in Sydney, Australia

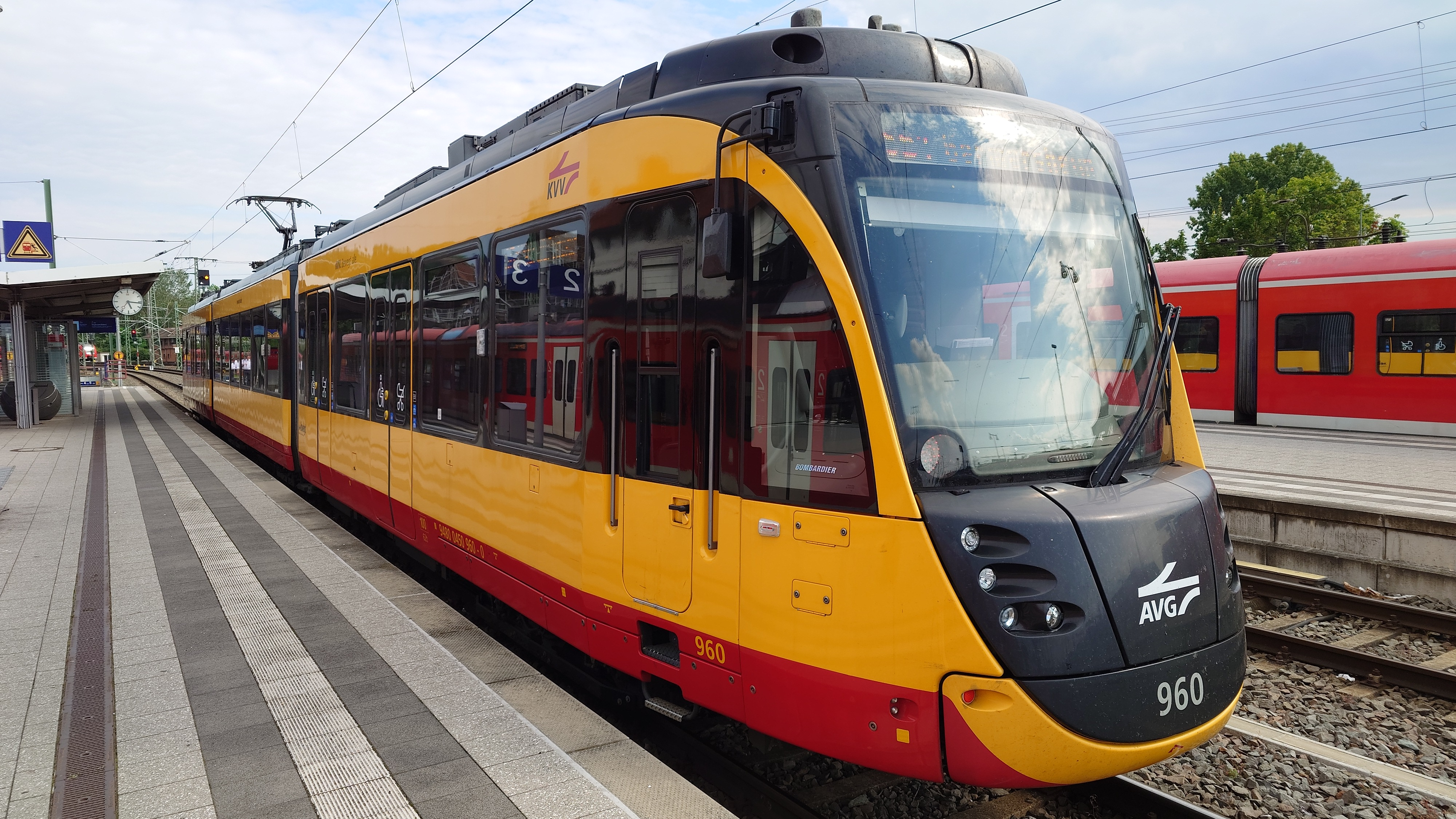
Tram-train in Karlsruhe region

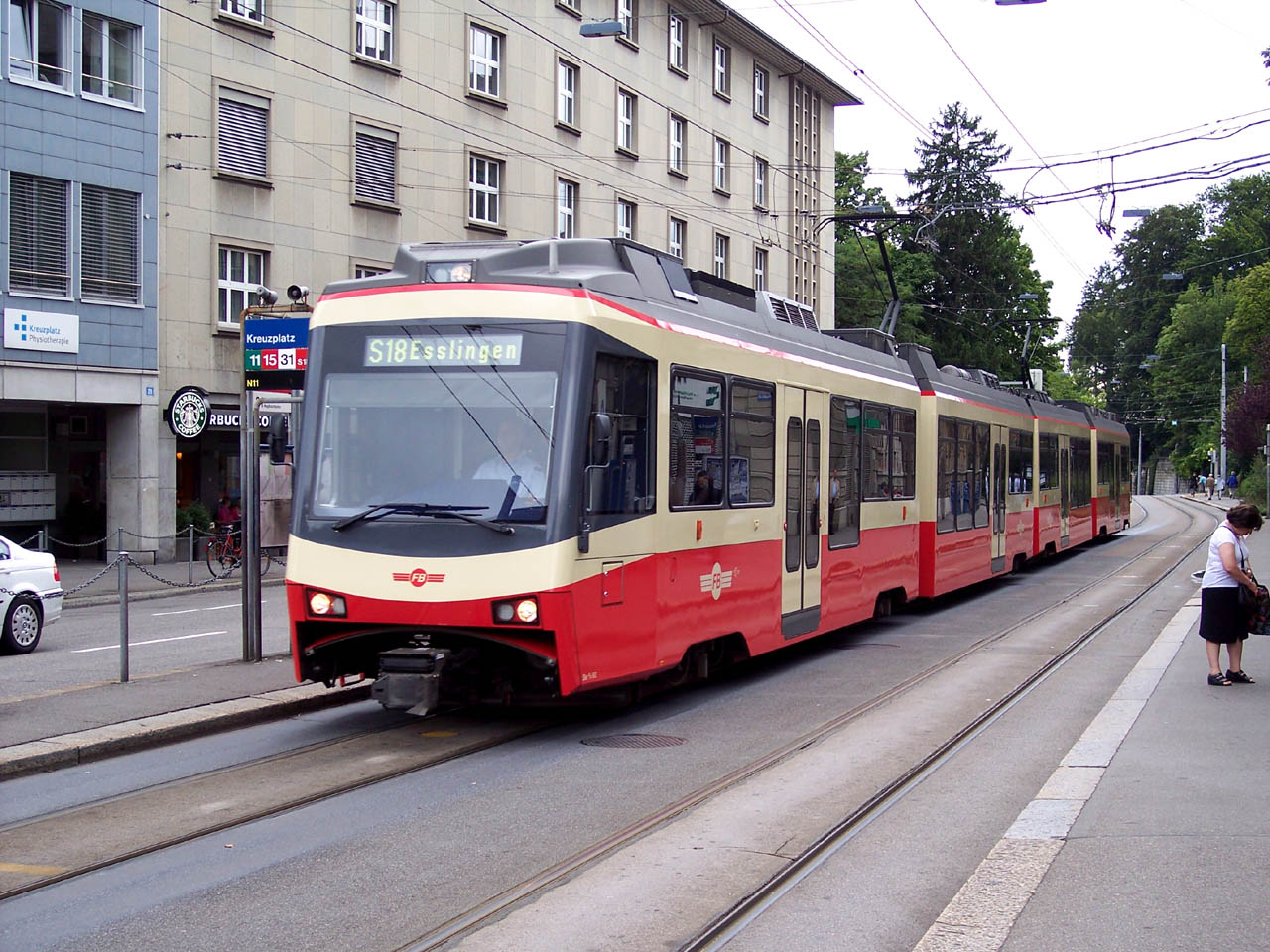
Interurban rail in Zurich

=== Tram and streetcar ===
Trams (also known as streetcars or trolleys) are railborne vehicles that originally ran in city streets, though over decades more and more dedicated tracks are used. They have higher capacity than buses, but must follow dedicated infrastructure with rails and wires either above or below the track, limiting their flexibility. In the United States, trams were commonly used prior to the 1930s, before being superseded by the bus. In modern public transport systems, they have been reintroduced in the form of the light rail.

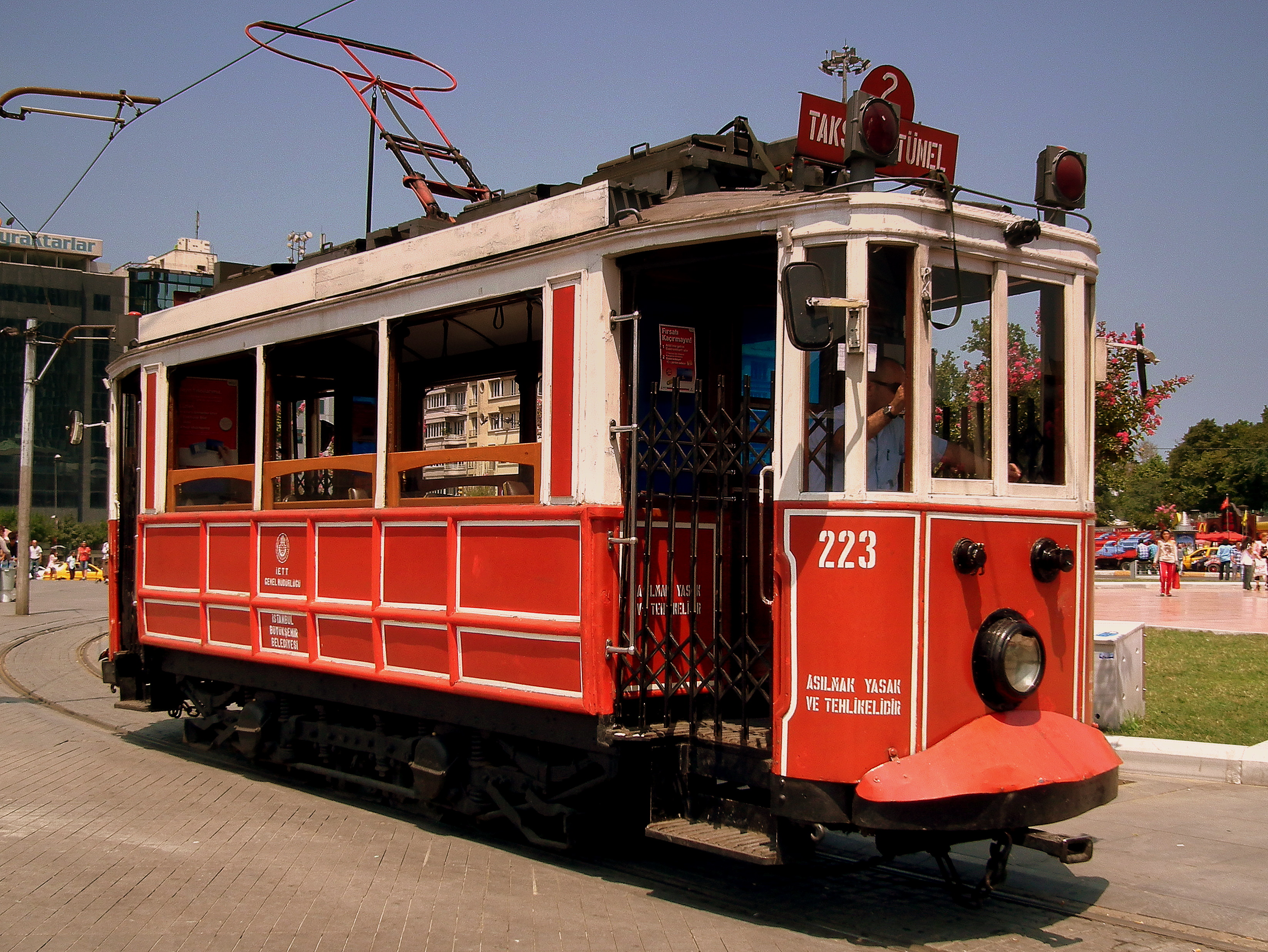
Heritage tramways in Istanbul

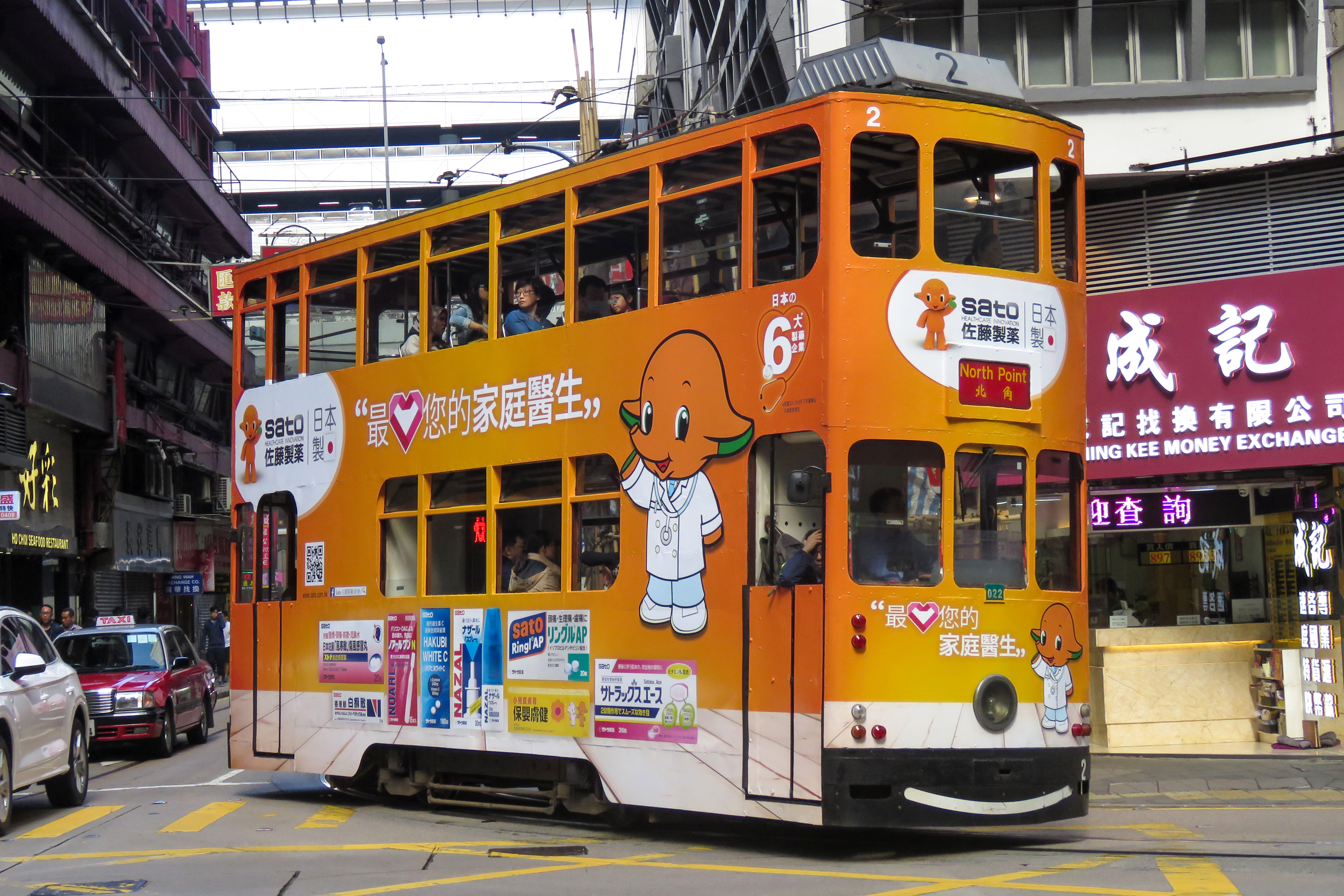
Double-decker tram in Hong Kong

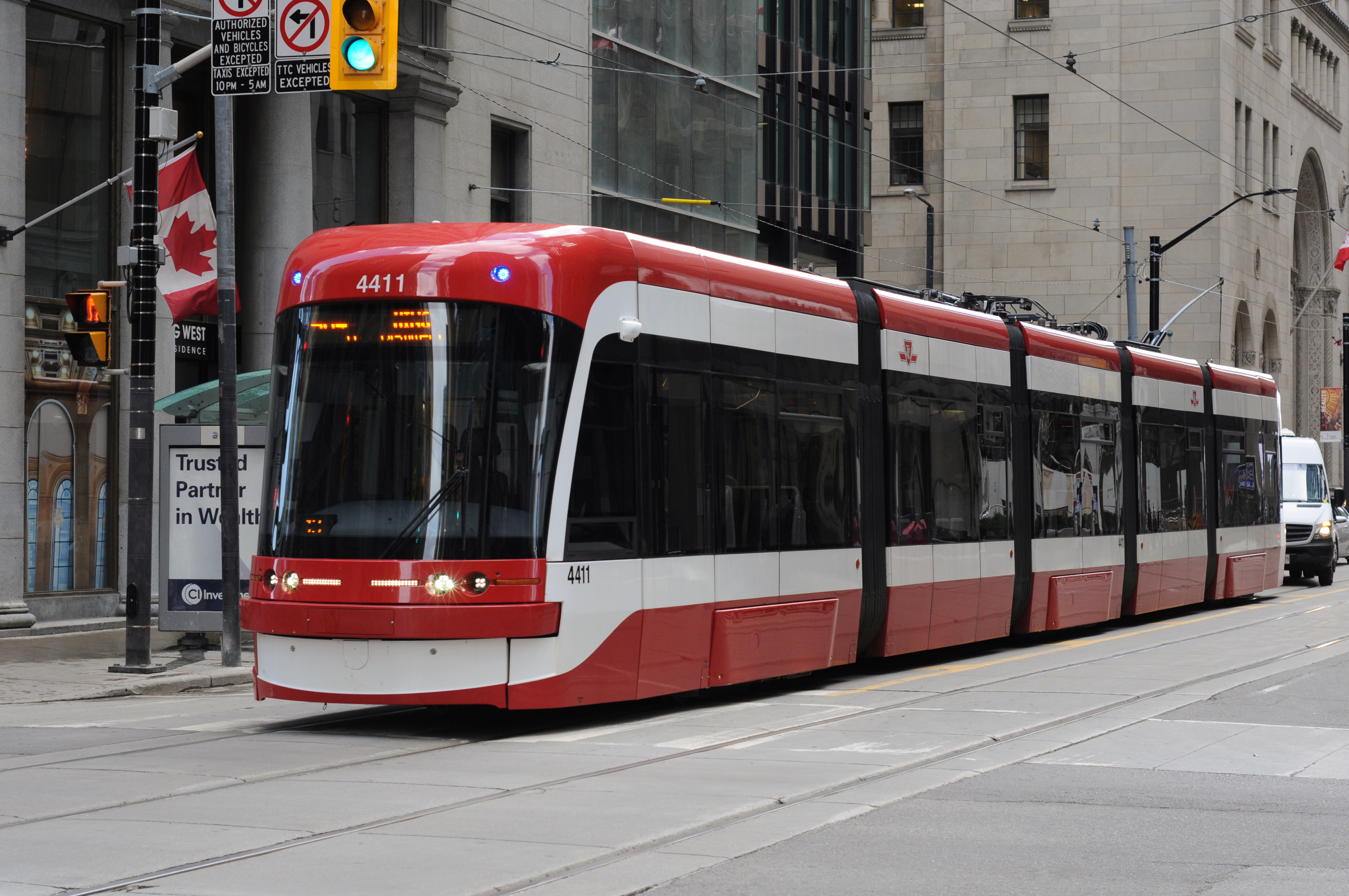
Modern streetcar in Toronto

=== Rubber-tyred tram ===
A rubber-tyred tram, is a development of the guided bus in which a vehicle is guided by a fixed rail in the road surface and draws current from overhead electric wires (either via pantograph or trolley pole).

A Translohr is a rubber-tyred tramway system, originally developed by Lohr Industrie of France and now run by a consortium of Alstom Transport and Fonds stratégique d'investissement (FSI) as newTL.

The Autonomous Rapid Transit (ART) is a lidar (light detection and ranging) guided bus and bi-articulated bus system for urban passenger transport. It is resembling a rubber-tyred tram as much a tram and a Bus rapid transit system.

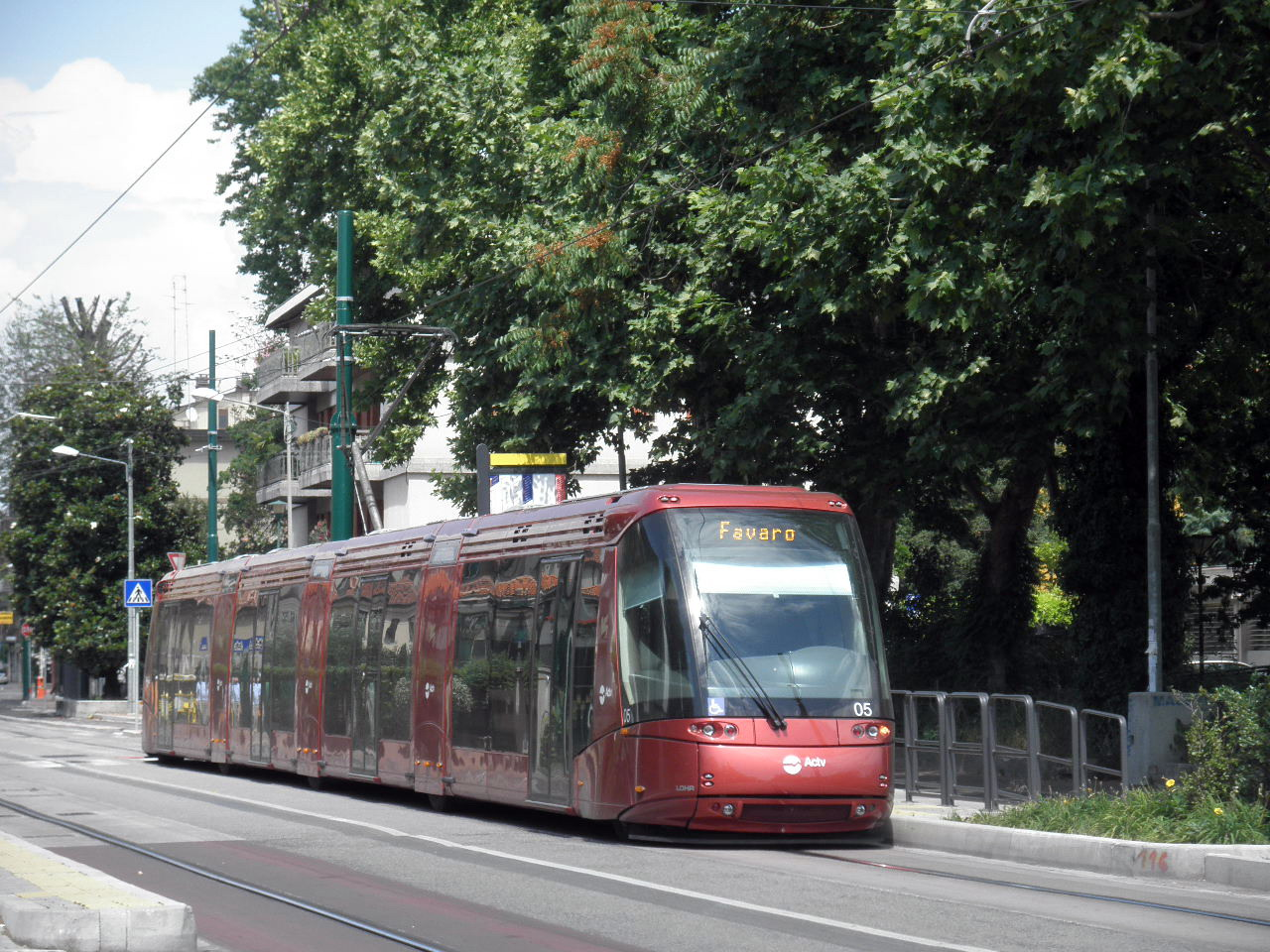
Translohr Mestre in Venice, Italy

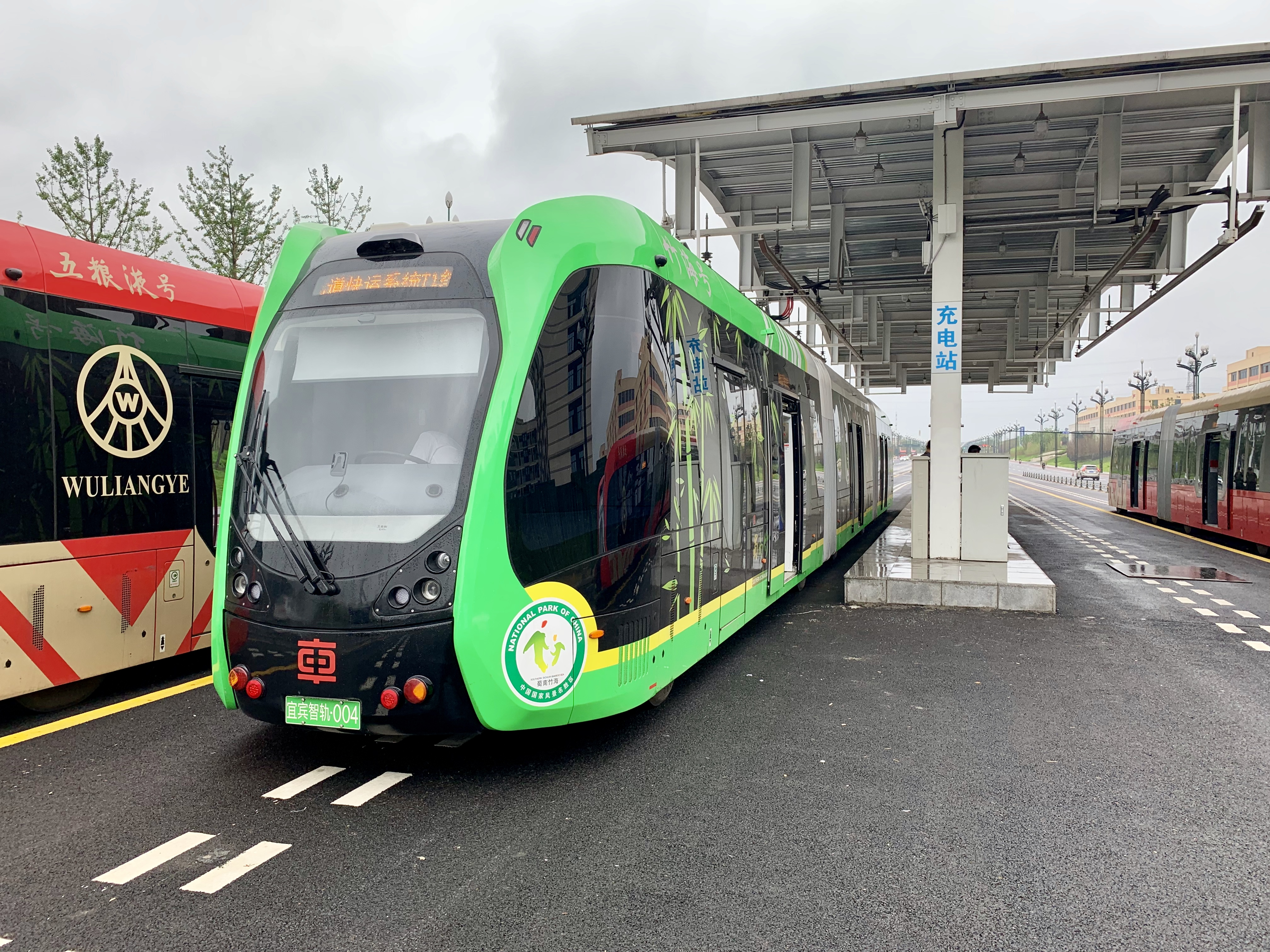
Yibin ART System in Sichuan, China

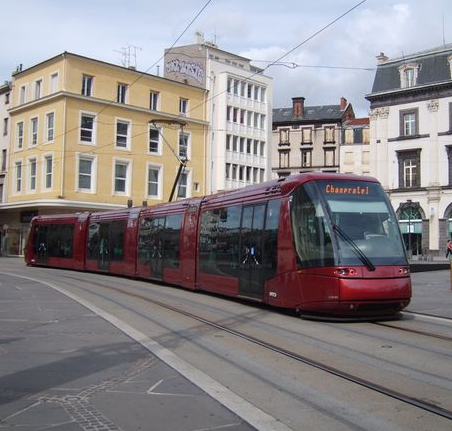
Rubber-tyred tram in Clermont-Ferrand

=== Rack railway ===
Rack railways, also known as cog railways or cogwheel railways, provide public transport in mountainous regions, in both rural and urban areas. They are characterized by an additional middle rack rail and one or more cogwheels (rack and pinion) to overcome steep gradients, as opposed to conventional adhesion railways.

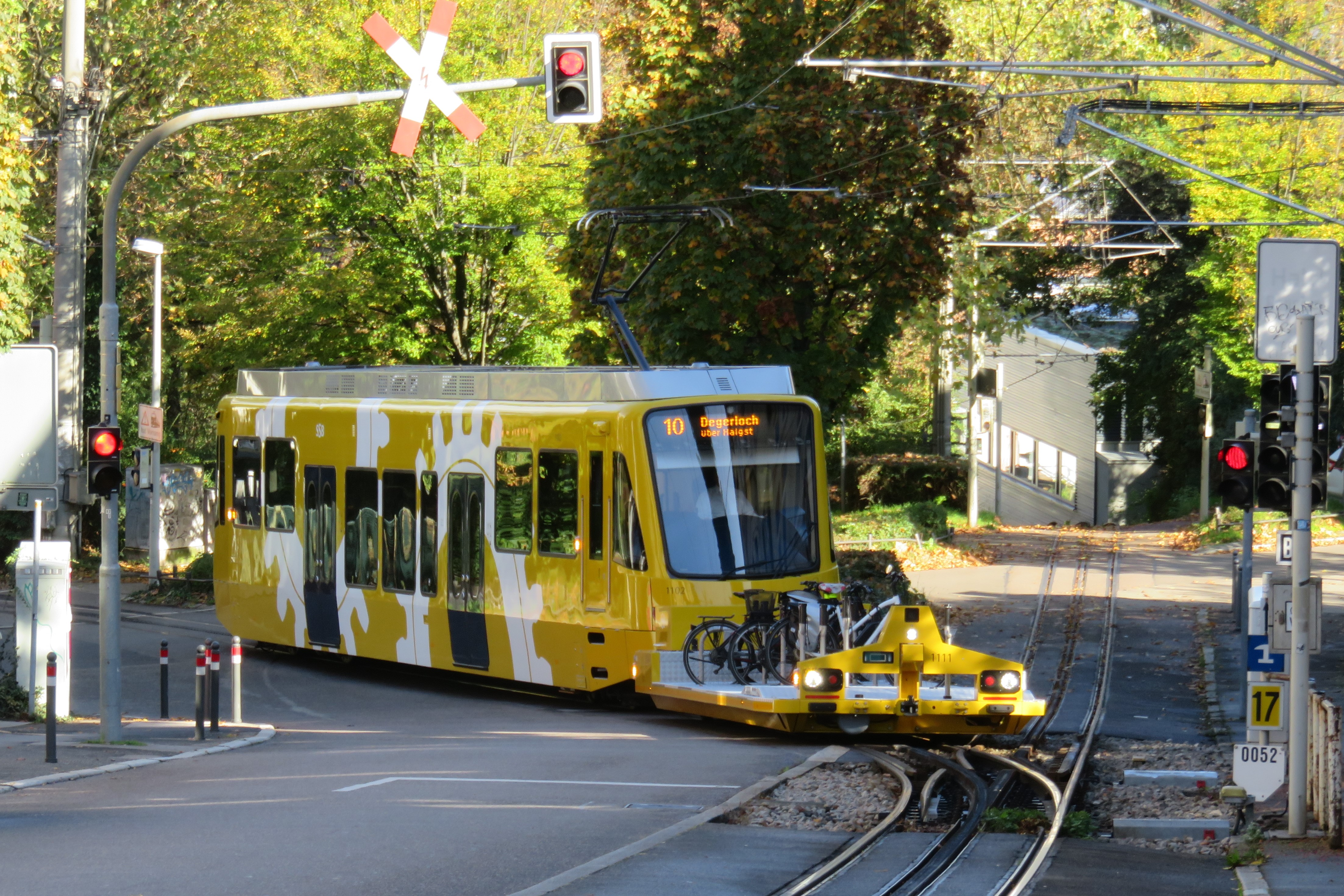
A rack railway with bicycle trailer in Stuttgart

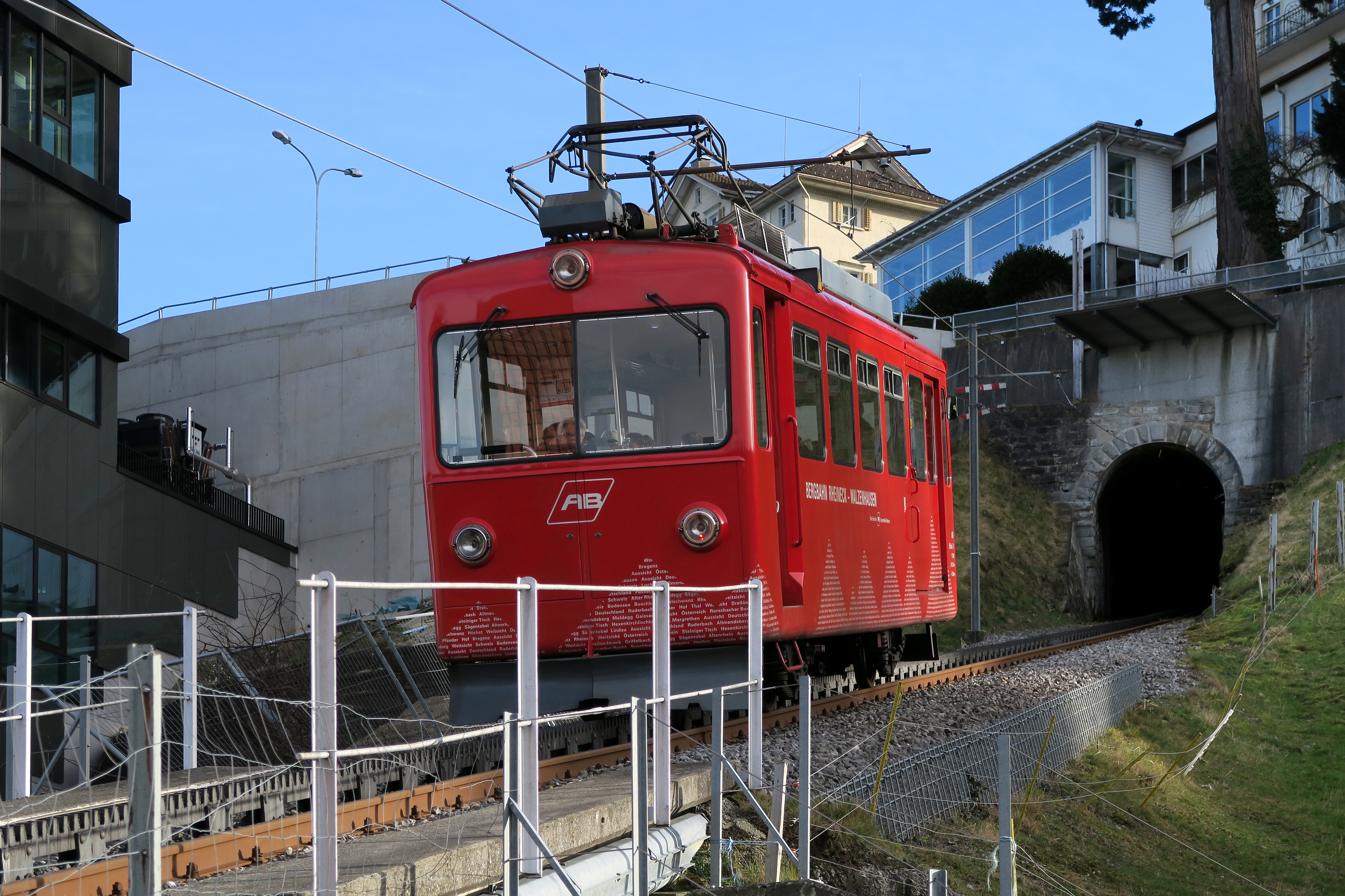
A rack railway in Switzerland

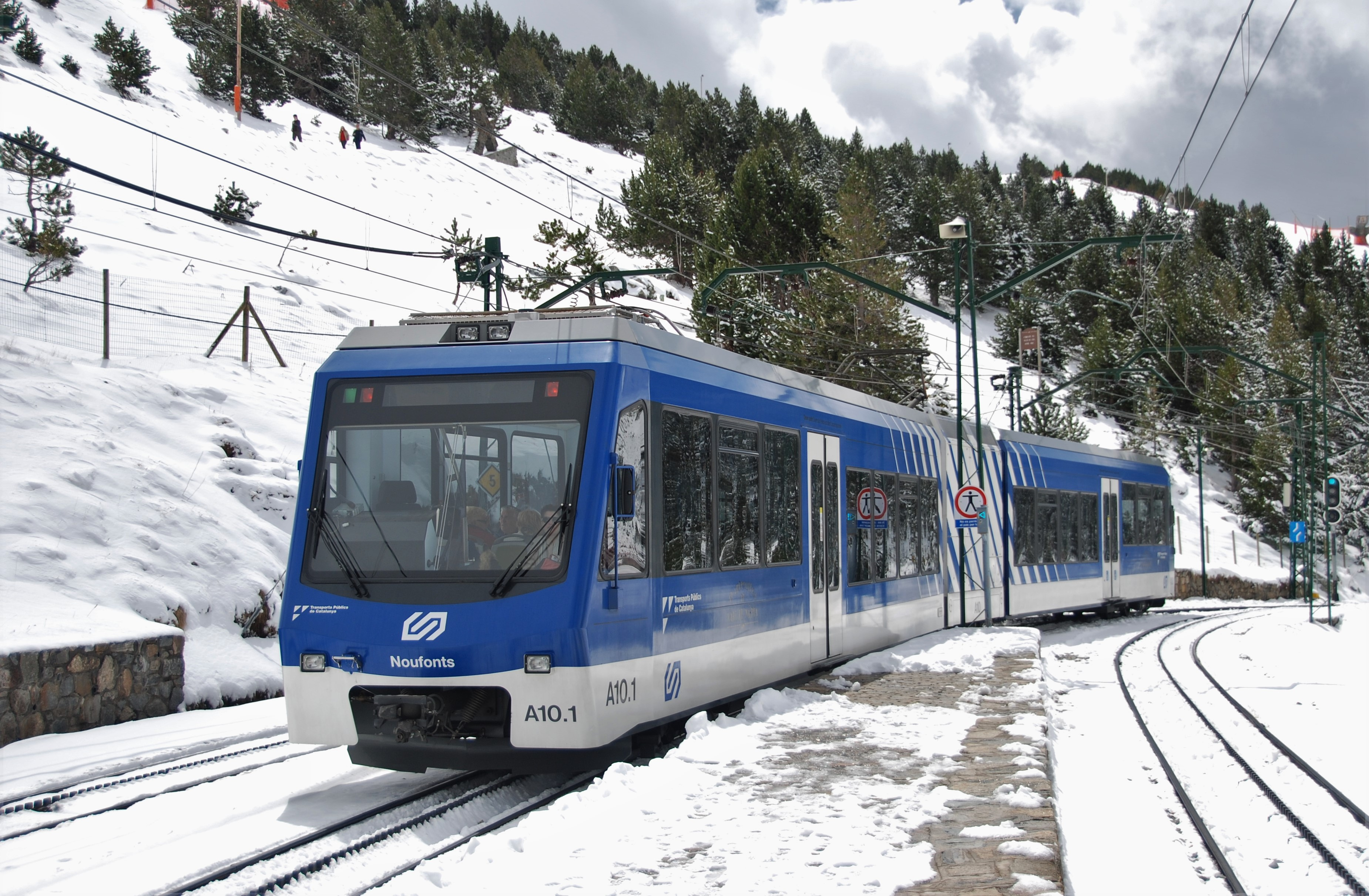
Vall de Núria Rack Railway in Catalonia

=== Monorail ===
Monorail systems generally use overhead tracks, similar to an elevated railway above other traffic. The systems are either mounted directly on the track supports or put in an overhead design with the train suspended. Maglevs use electromagnets instead of wheels on rail.

Monorail systems are used throughout the world (especially in Europe and east Asia, particularly Japan), but apart from public transit installations in Las Vegas and Seattle, most North American monorails are either short shuttle services or privately owned services (with 150,000 daily riders, the Disney monorail systems is a successful example).

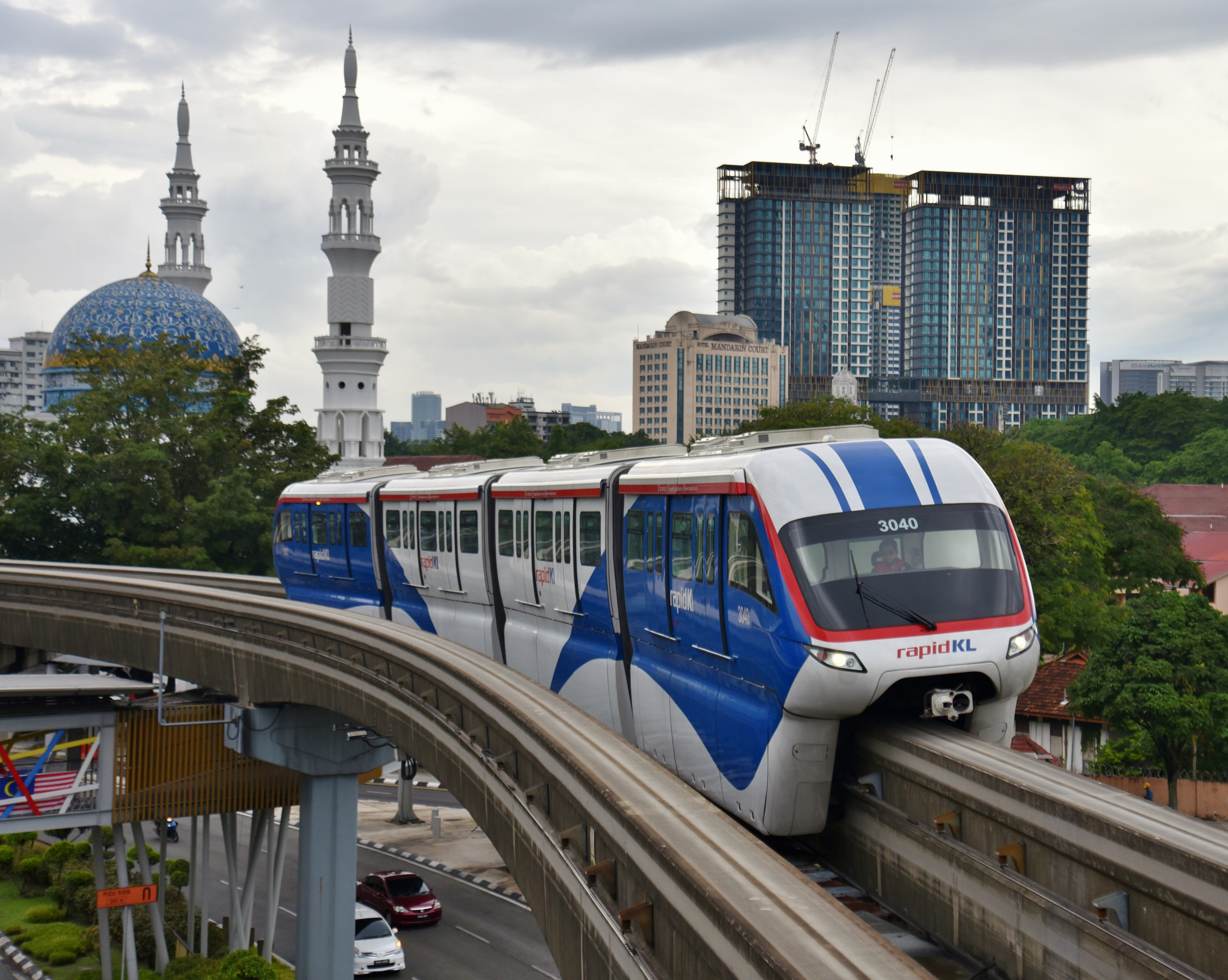
A monorail in Kuala Lumpur

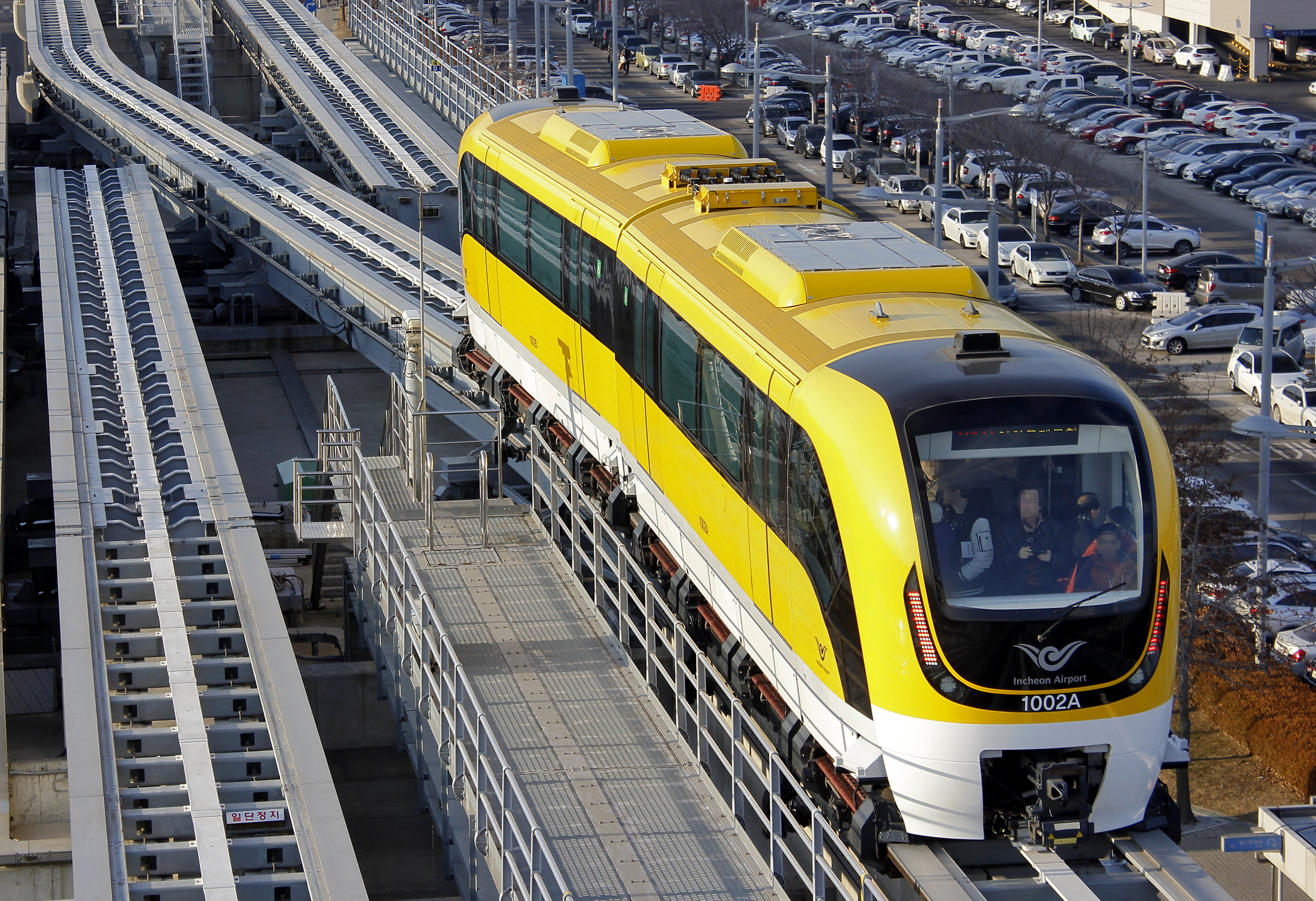
A maglev at Incheon Airport, South Korea

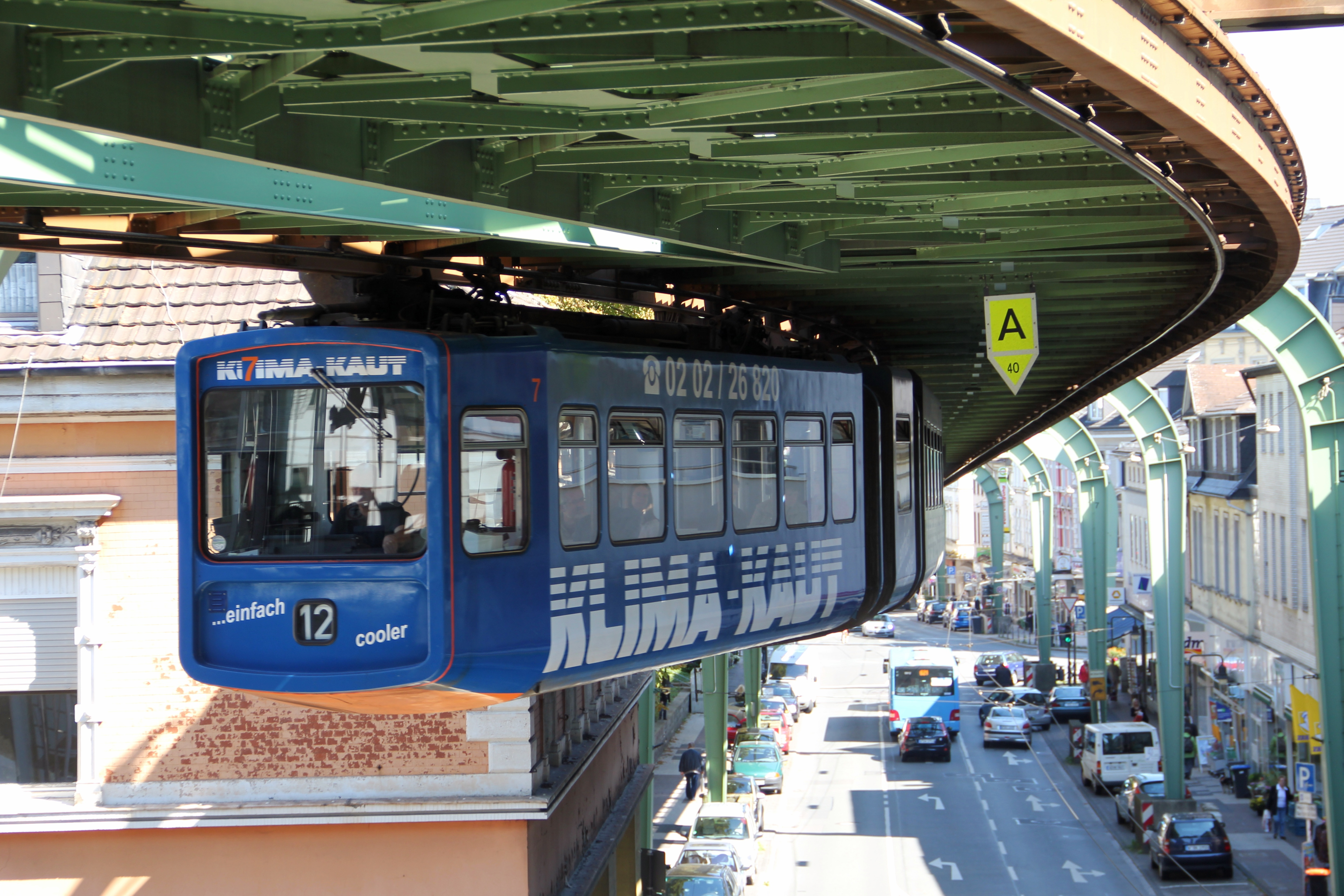
Suspension railway in Wuppertal

=== Personal rapid transit and people mover ===
Personal rapid transit (PRT) is an automated cab service that runs on rails or a guideway. This is an uncommon mode of transportation (excluding elevators) due to the complexity of automation. A fully implemented system might provide most of the convenience of individual automobiles with the efficiency of public transit. The crucial innovation is that the automated vehicles carry just a few passengers, turn off the guideway to pick up passengers (permitting other PRT vehicles to continue at full speed), and drop them off to the location of their choice (rather than at a stop). Conventional transit simulations show that PRT might attract many auto users in problematic medium-density urban areas. A number of experimental systems are in progress. One might compare personal rapid transit to the more labor-intensive taxi or paratransit modes of transportation, or to the (by now automated) elevators common in many publicly accessible areas.

Automated people mover (APM) are a special term for grade-separated rail which uses vehicles that are smaller and shorter in size. These systems are generally used only in a small area such as a theme park or an airport.

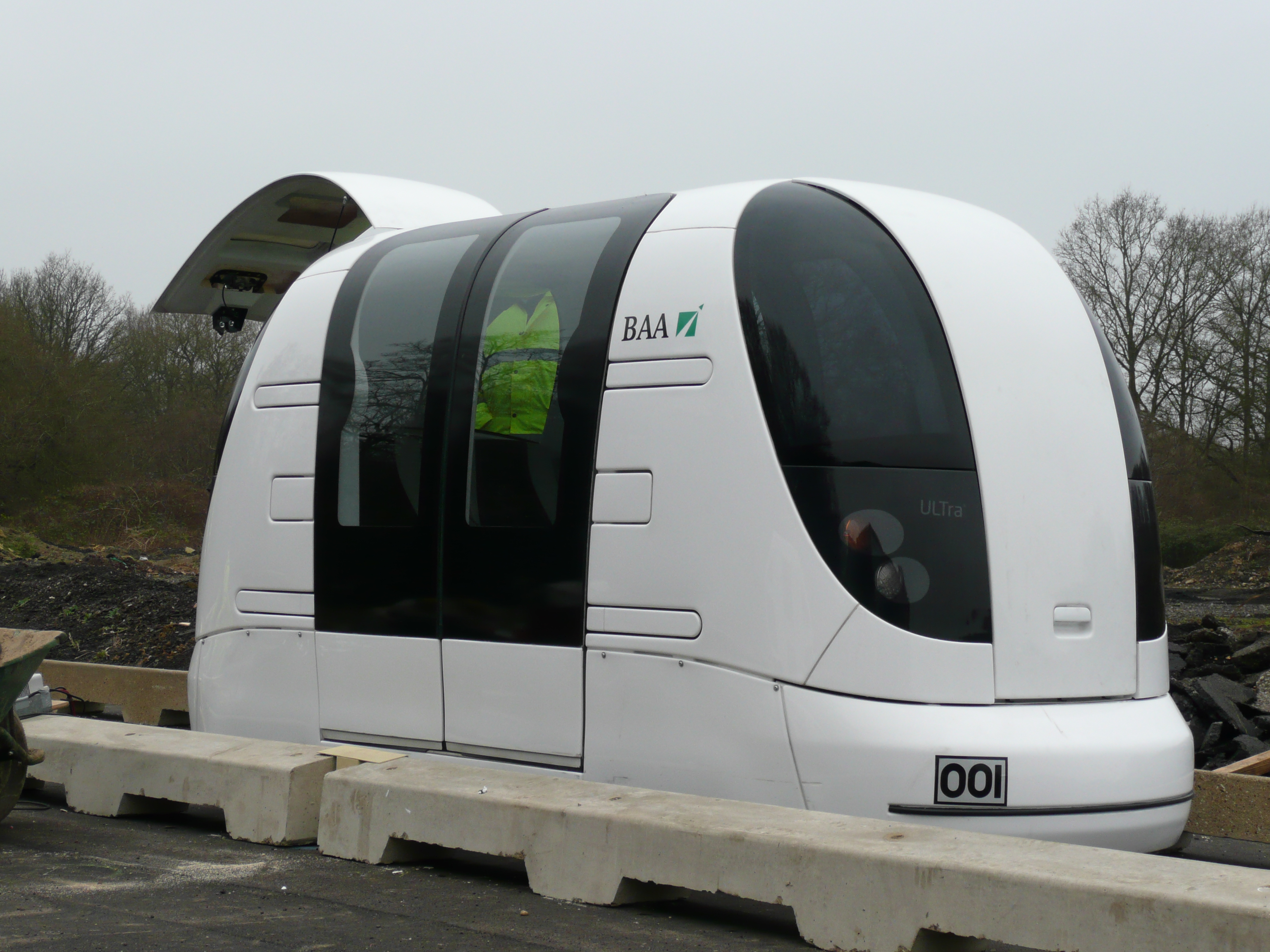
Ultra Personal rapid transit at London Heathrow

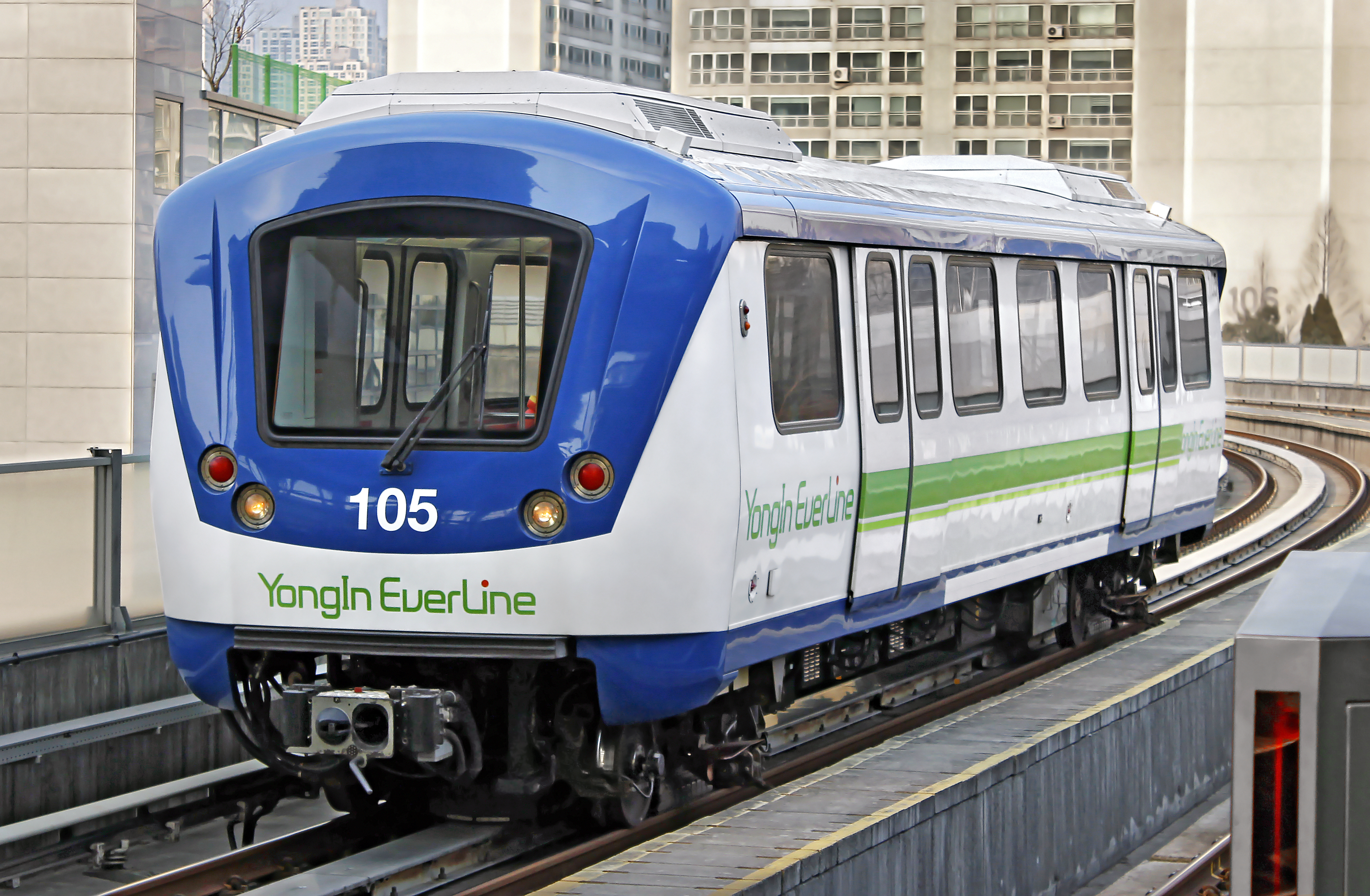
EverLine Innovia ART 200 train in Yongin, South Korea People Mover

=== Cable-propelled transit and funicular ===
Cable-propelled transit (CPT) is a transit technology that moves people in motor-less, engine-less vehicles that are propelled by a steel cable. There are two sub-groups of CPT—gondola lifts and cable cars (railway). Gondola lifts are supported and propelled from above by cables, whereas cable cars are supported and propelled from below by cables.

While historically associated with usage in ski resorts, gondola lifts are now finding increased consumption and utilization in many urban areas—built specifically for the purposes of mass transit. Many, if not all, of these systems are implemented and fully integrated within existing public transportation networks. Examples include Metrocable (Medellín), Metrocable (Caracas), Mi Teleférico in La Paz, Portland Aerial Tram, Roosevelt Island Tramway in New York City, and the London Cable Car.

Funicular is a type of cable railway system that connects points along a railway track laid on a steep slope. The system is characterized by two counterbalanced carriages (also called cars or trains) permanently attached to opposite ends of a haulage cable, which is looped over a pulley at the upper end of the track

Hovertrains are also cable-driven but use a cushion pad instead of rails. Examples are the U-bahn in the car-free resort town of Serfaus, or previously the Narita Airport Terminal 2 shuttle in Japan and the Duke Hospital MRT in North Carolina.

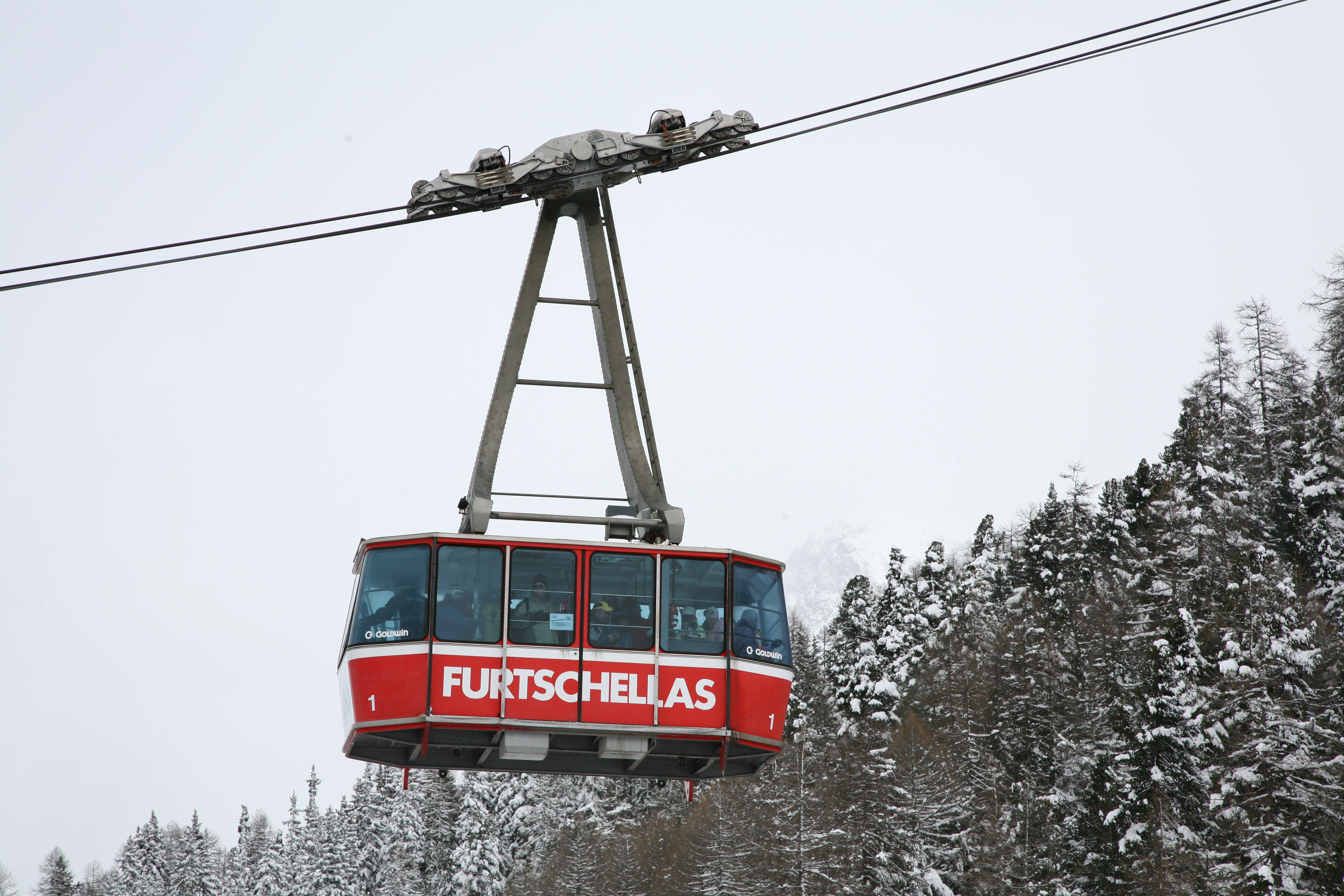
An aerial tram in Engadin, Switzerland

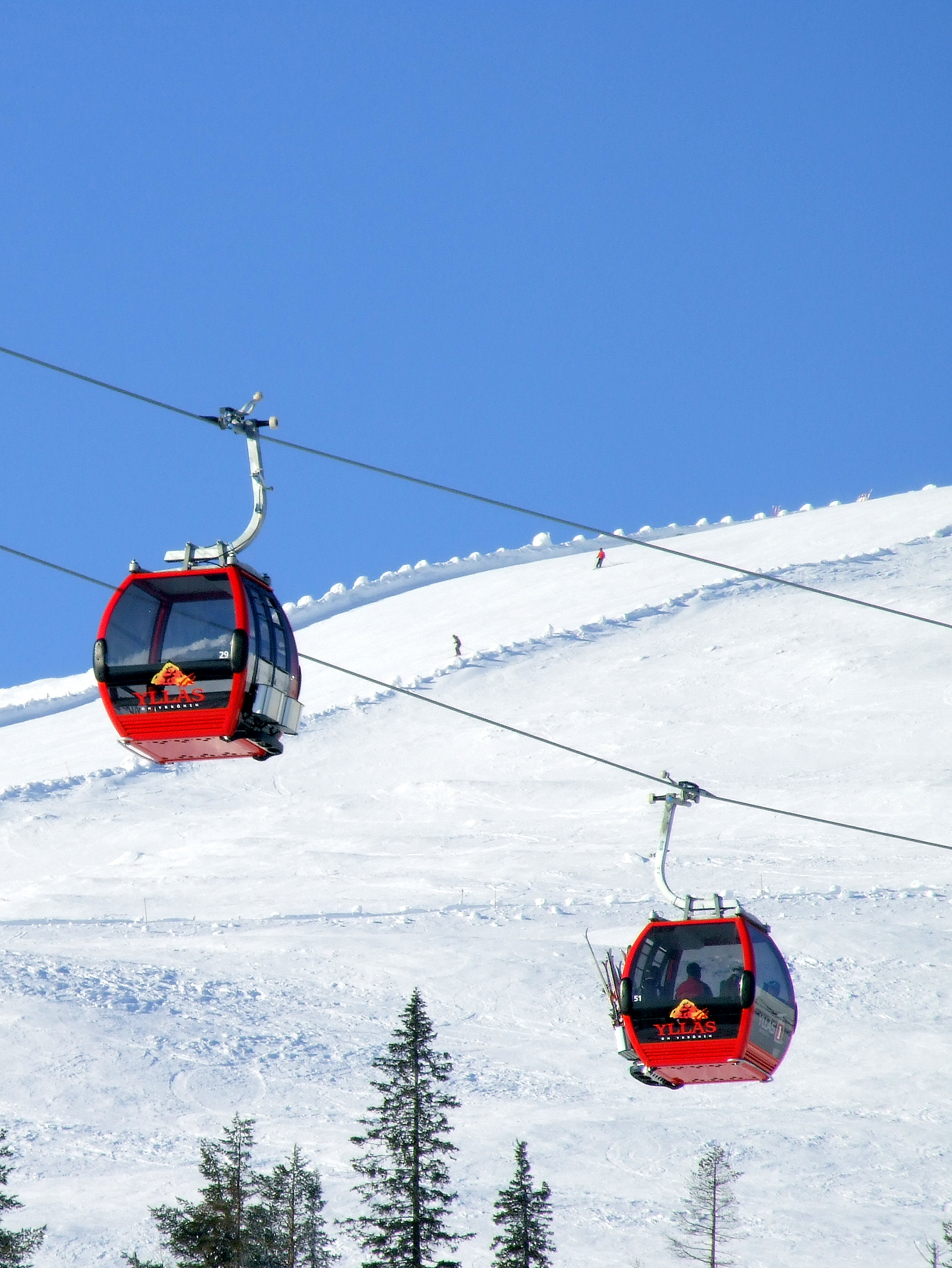
Gondola lifts in Ylläs ski resort in Lapland, Finland

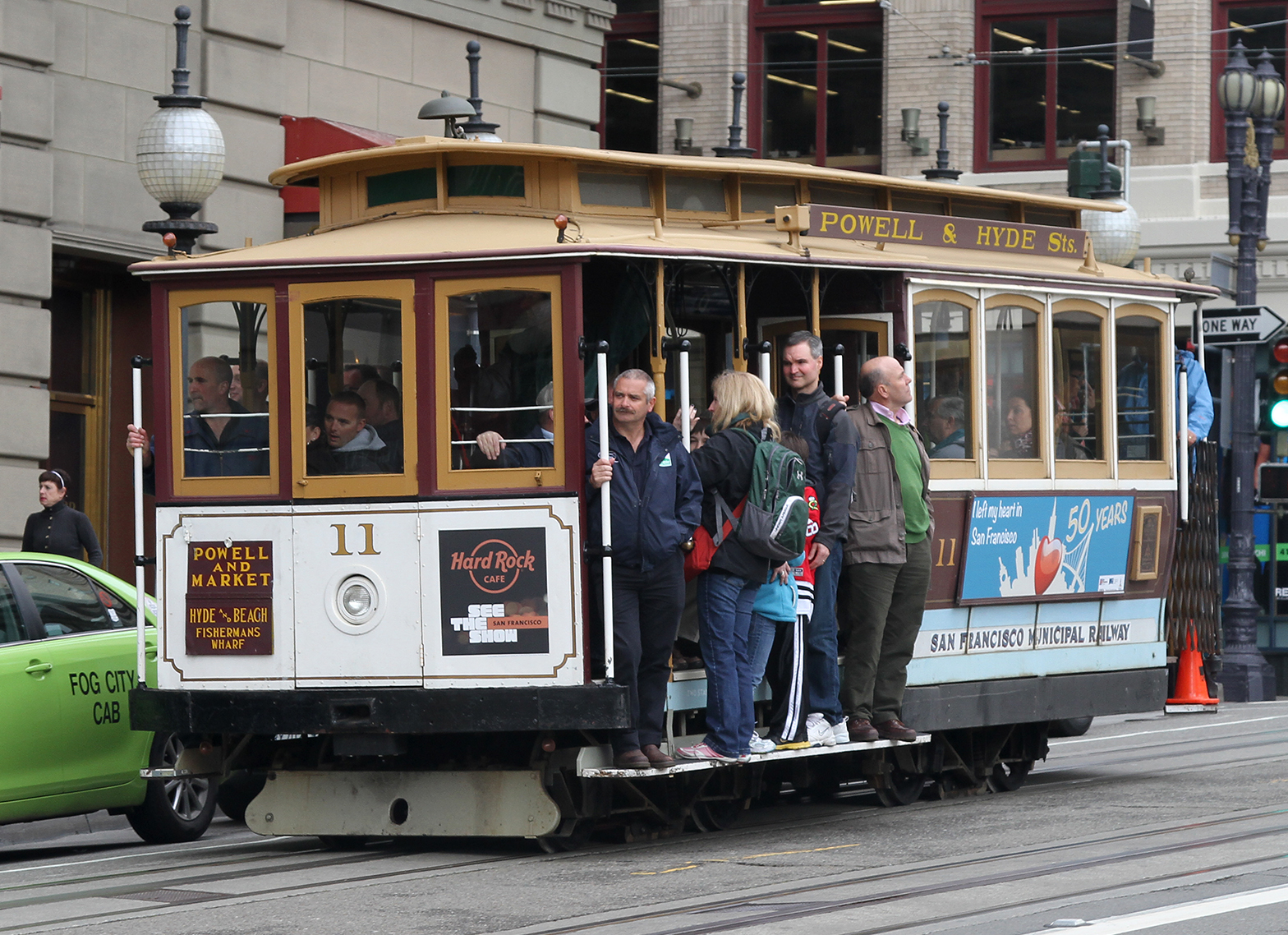
Cable car in San Francisco

=== Ferry ===
A ferry is a boat used to carry (or ferry) passengers, and sometimes their vehicles, across a body of water. A foot-passenger ferry with many stops is sometimes called a water bus. Ferries form a part of the public transport systems of many waterside cities and islands, allowing direct transit between points at a capital cost much lower than bridges or tunnels, though at a lower speed. Ship connections of much larger distances (such as over long distances in water bodies like the Mediterranean Sea) may also be called ferry services.

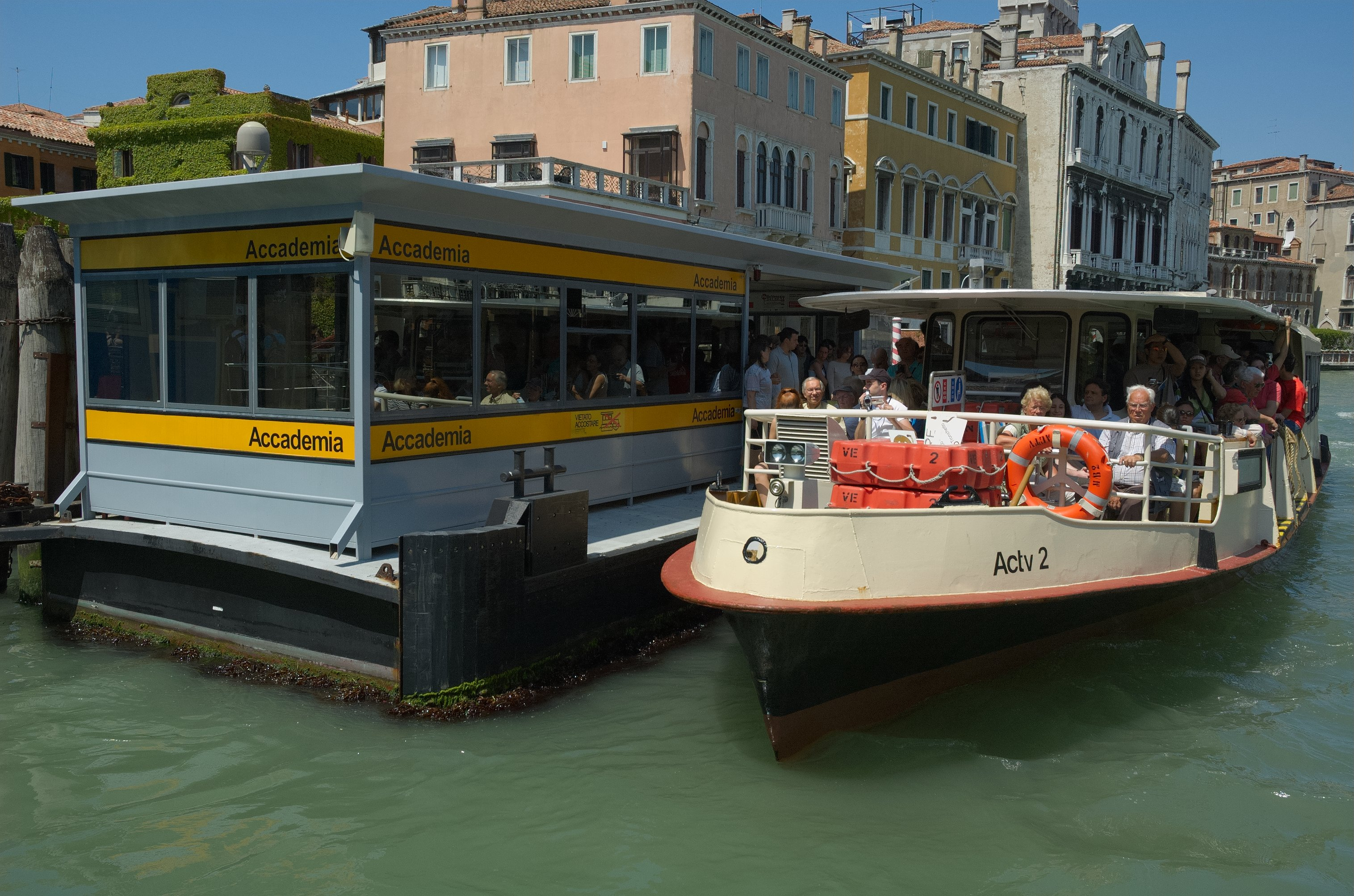
Water bus (vaporetto) at bus stop in Venice, Italy

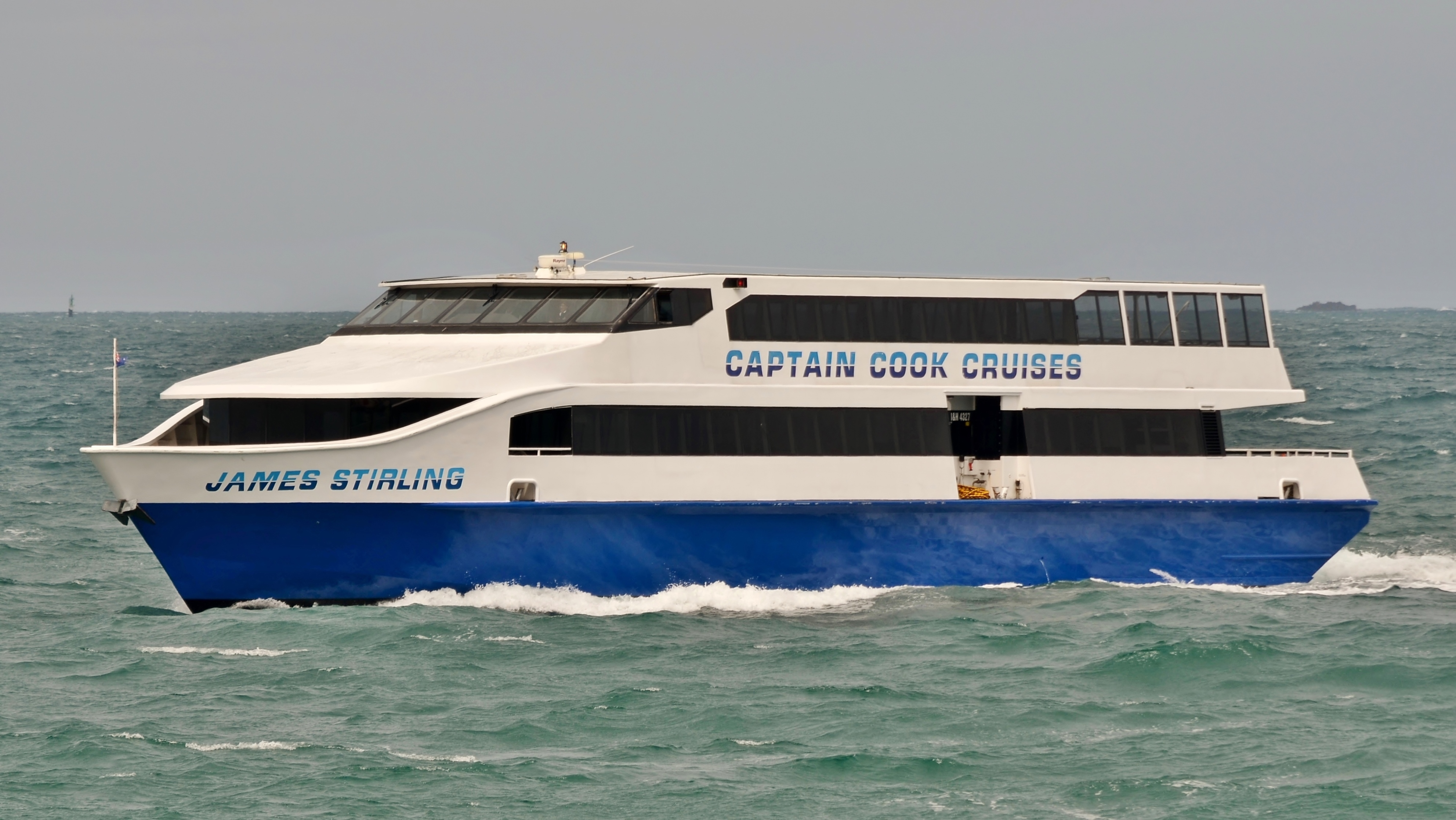
Captain Cook Cruises Western Australia entering into Fremantle

=== Integration with cycling ===
According to Dutch transport planner, Karel Martens, more frequent cycling increases the accessibility of public transportation to people. This is due to cycling being faster than walking and more flexible than other feeder services. According to Martens, increasing bicycle access can increase the amount of passengers who can access public transport. Many cities around the world have introduced bikes, electric bikes, and scooters to their public transport infrastructure. Good cycling infrastructure, including good parking at stations, makes it feasible for people to travel further to public transport stations.

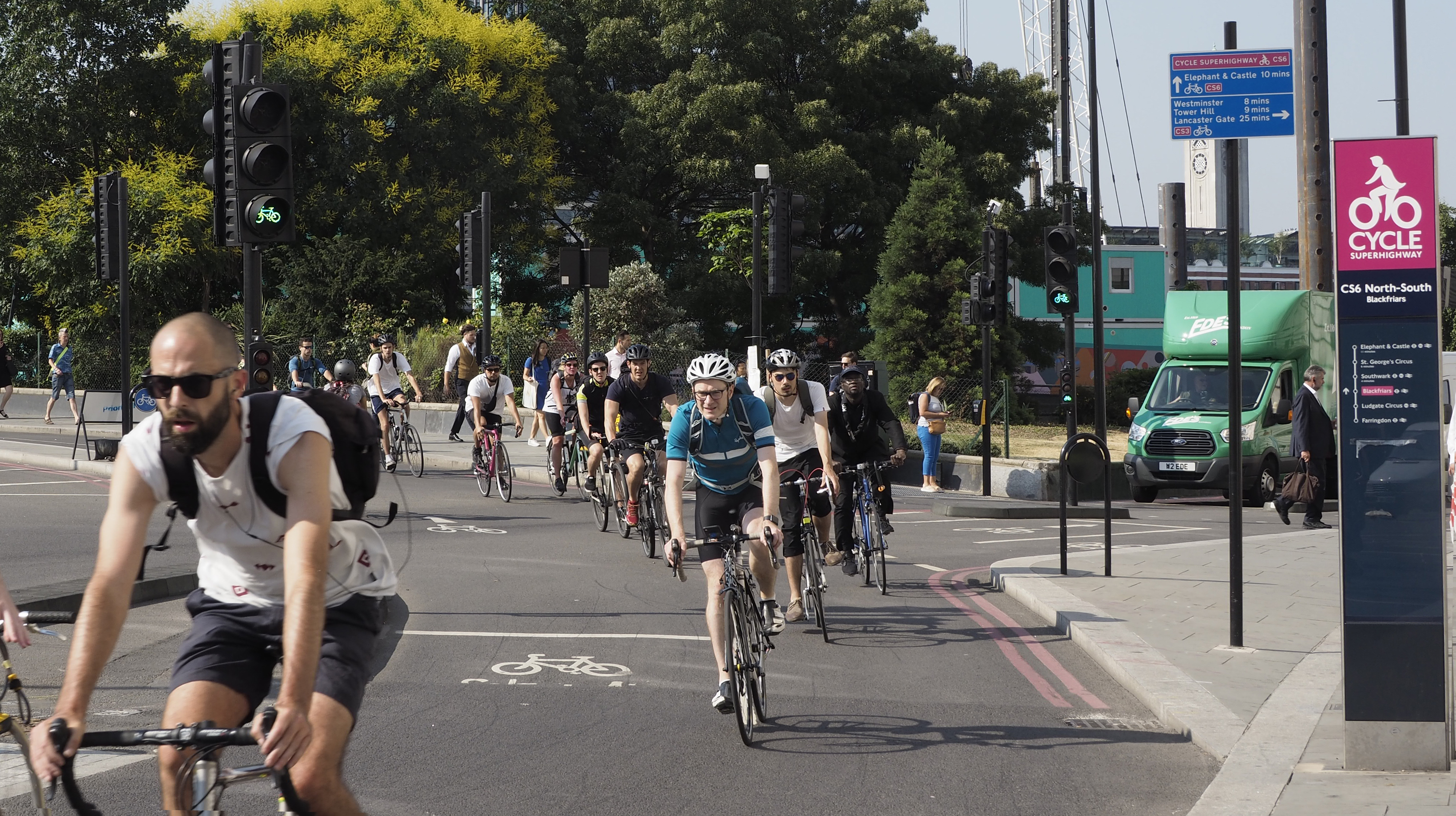
Cycle Superhighway CS6 is part of London's Cycle Network infrastructure.

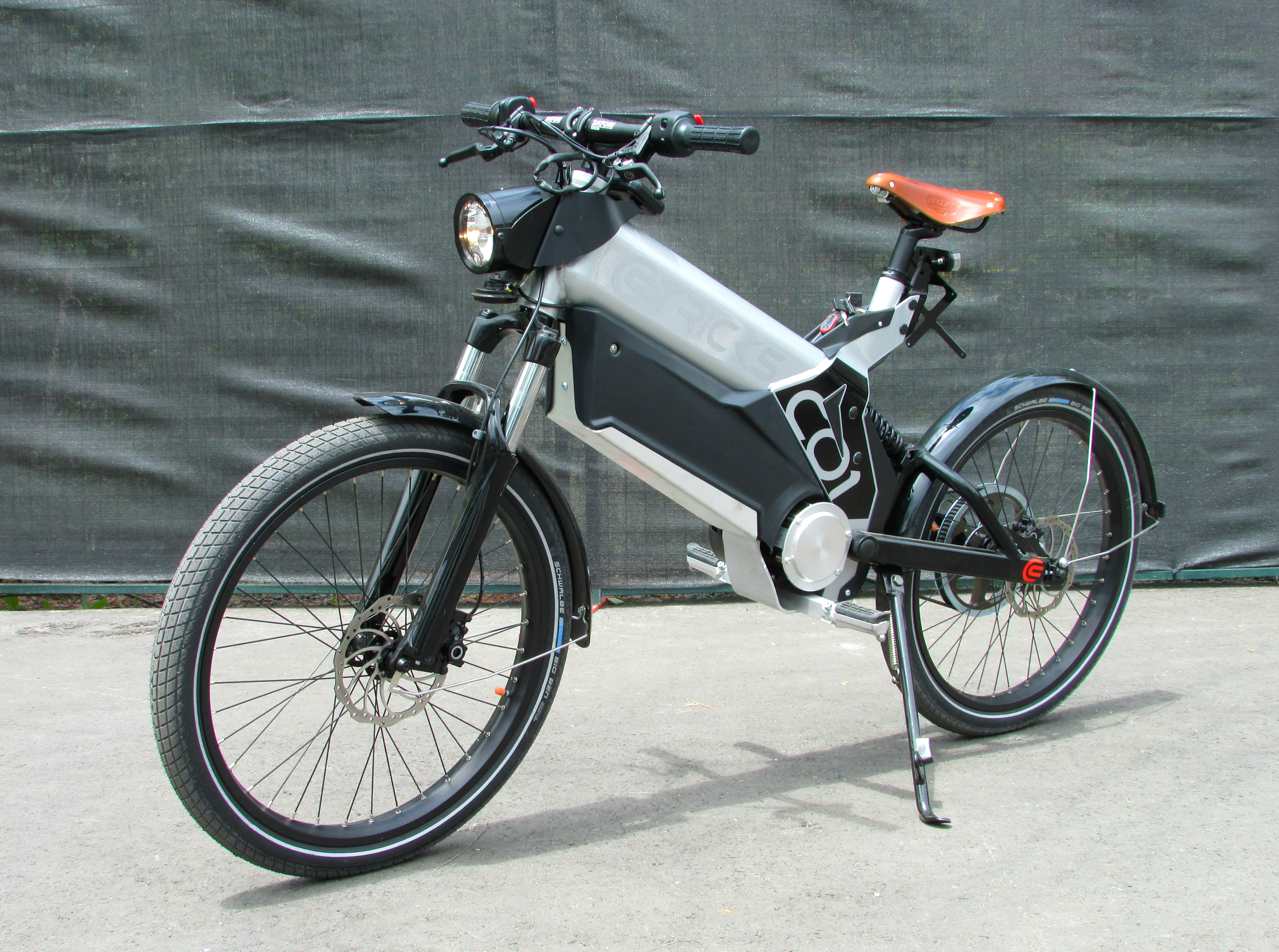
eTricks C01, electric bicycle made in France

== Operation ==
=== Infrastructure ===
All public transport runs on infrastructure, either on roads, rail, airways or seaways. The infrastructure can be shared with other modes, freight and private transport, or it can be dedicated to public transport. The latter is especially valuable in cases where there are capacity problems for private transport. Investments in infrastructure are expensive and make up a substantial part of the total costs in systems that are new or expanding. Once built, the infrastructure will require operating and maintenance costs, adding to the total cost of public transport. Sometimes governments subsidize infrastructure by providing it free of charge, just as is common with roads for automobiles.

=== Interchanges ===
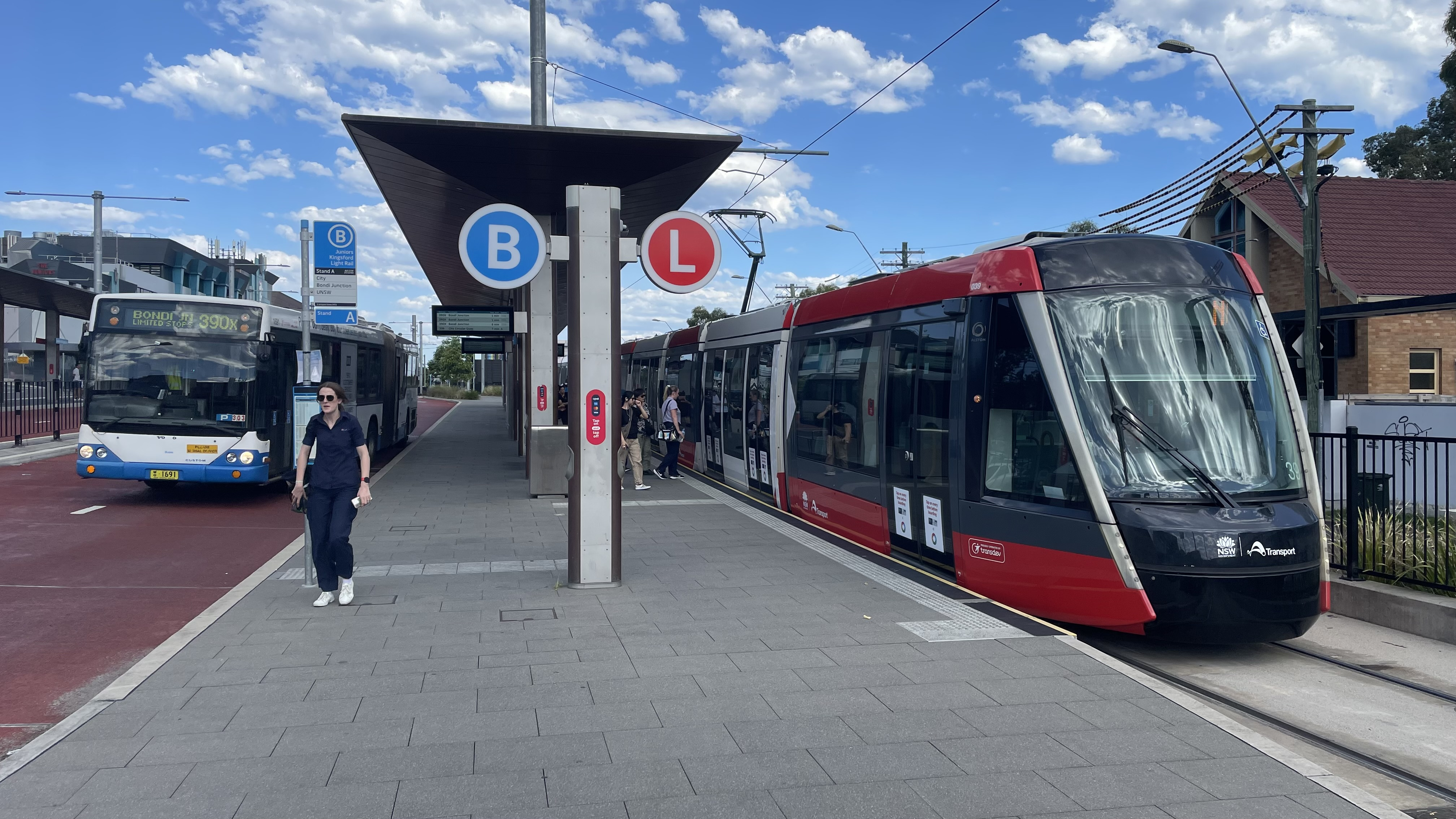
Bus stop next to a tramway station on the Sydney light rail network.

Interchanges are locations where passengers can switch from one public transport route to another. This may be between vehicles of the same mode (like a bus interchange), or e.g. between bus and train. It can be between local and intercity transport (such as at a central station or airport). Interchanges can also occur when cyclists park their bicycles and access public transportation. A comparison by Karel Martens of the Netherlands, Germany and the United Kingdom found that rail and other faster, higher-quality public-transport services attracted substantially more bike-and-ride users than local buses, trams and other slower services.

=== Timetables ===
Timetables (or 'schedules' in North American English) are provided by the transport operator to allow users to plan their journeys. They are often supplemented by maps and fare schemes to help travelers coordinate their travel. Online public transport route planners help make planning easier. Mobile apps are often available for multiple transit systems that provide timetables and other service information and, in some cases, allow ticket purchase, some allowing to plan your journey, with time fares zones e.g.

Services are often arranged to operate at regular intervals throughout the day or part of the day (known as clock-face scheduling). Often, more frequent services or even extra routes are operated during the morning and evening rush hours. Coordination between services at interchange points is important to reduce the total travel time for passengers. This can be done by coordinating shuttle services with main routes, or by creating a fixed time (for instance twice per hour) when all bus and rail routes meet at a station and exchange passengers. There is often a potential conflict between this objective and optimising the utilisation of vehicles and drivers.

=== Financing ===
The main sources of financing are ticket revenue, government subsidies and advertising. The percentage of revenue from passenger charges is known as the farebox recovery ratio. A limited amount of income may come from land development and rental income from stores and vendors, parking fees, and leasing tunnels and rights-of-way to carry fiber optic communication lines.

==== Fare and ticketing ====
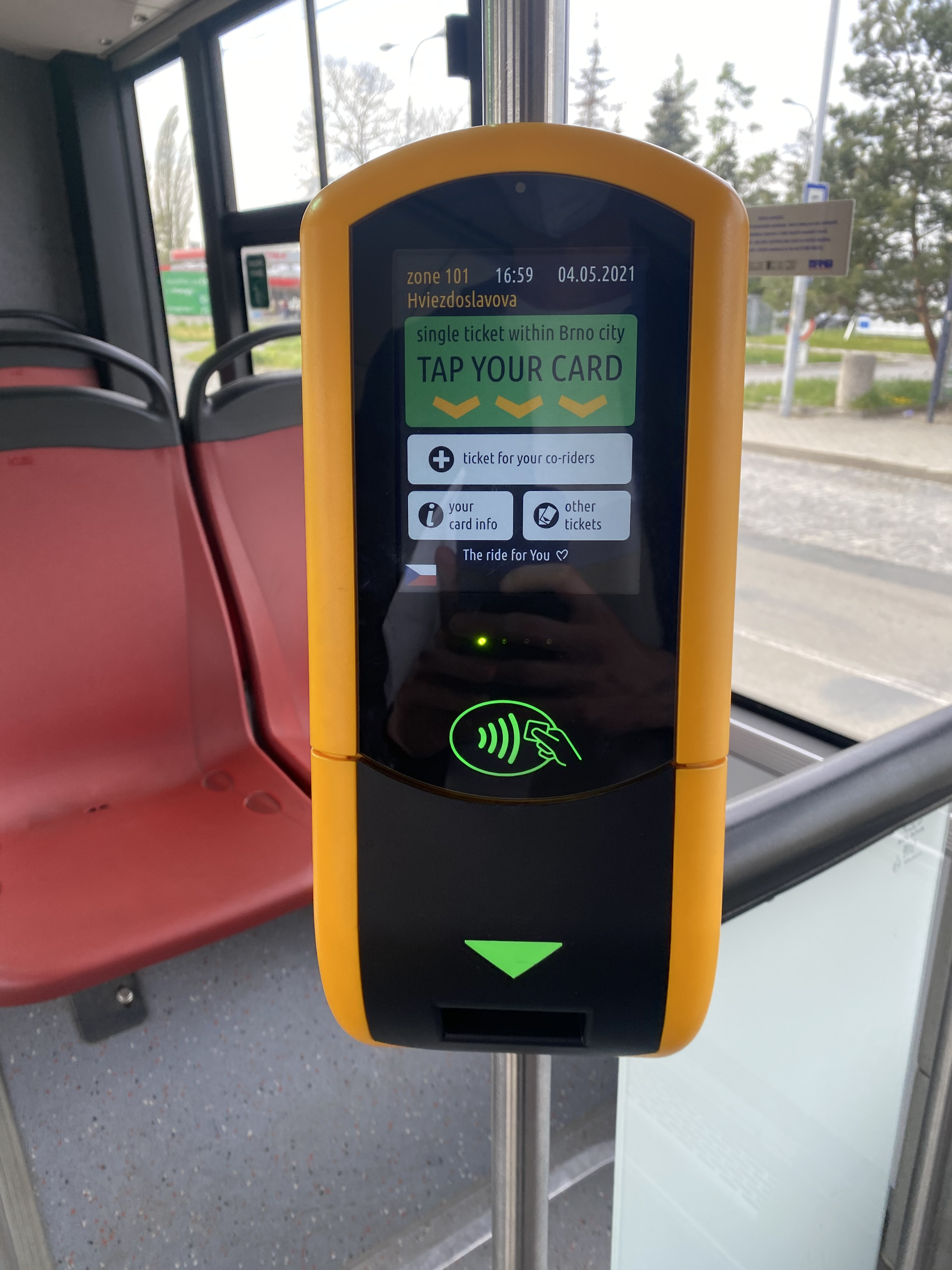
A contactless validator in Brno

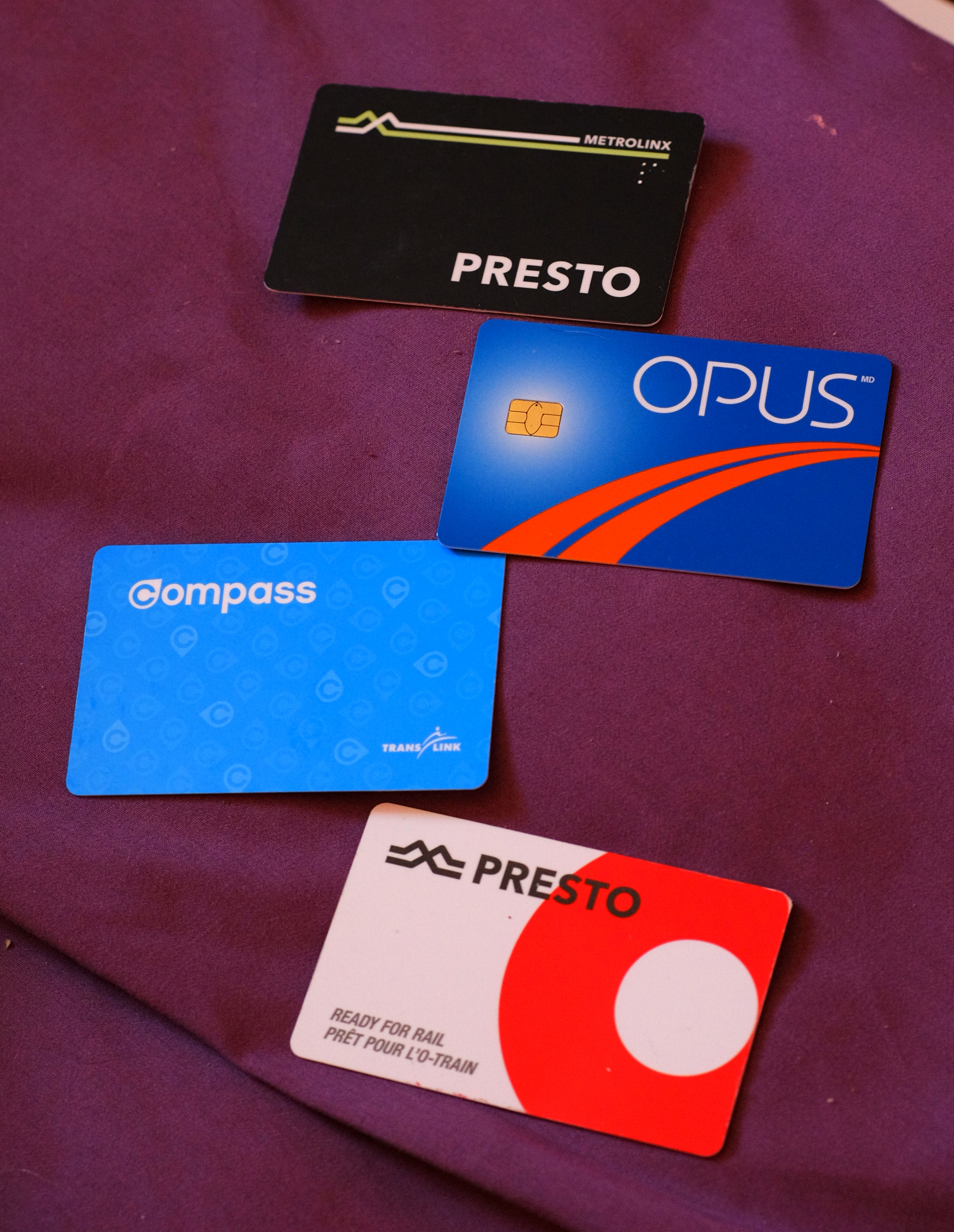
Smart fare cards for public transportation tickets in the four biggest cities in Canada.

Most—but not all—public transport requires the purchase of a ticket to generate revenue for the operators. Tickets may be bought either in advance, or at the time of the journey, or the carrier may allow both methods. Passengers may be issued with a paper ticket, a metal or plastic token, or a magnetic or electronic card (smart card, contactless smart card). Sometimes a ticket has to be validated, e.g. a paper ticket has to be stamped, or an electronic ticket has to be checked in.

Tickets may be valid for a single (or return) trip, or valid within a certain area for a period of time (see transit pass). The fare is based on the travel class, either depending on the traveled distance, or based on zone pricing. A rail pass is a transit pass for rail, for which there are offers for tourists to Europe (Eurail, Interrail), Japan, South Korea, Taiwan, the United Kingdom (BritRail Pass), the United States (USA Rail Pass) and previously India.

The tickets may have to be shown or checked automatically at the station platform or when boarding, or during the ride by a conductor. Operators may choose to control all riders, allowing sale of the ticket at the time of ride. Alternatively, a proof-of-payment system allows riders to enter the vehicles without showing the ticket, but riders may or may not be controlled by a ticket controller; if the rider fails to show proof of payment, the operator may fine the rider at the magnitude of the fare.

Multi-use tickets allow travel more than once. In addition to return tickets, this includes period cards allowing travel within a certain area (for instance month cards), or to travel a specified number of trips or number of days that can be chosen within a longer period of time (called carnet ticket). Passes aimed at tourists, allowing free or discounted entry at many tourist attractions, typically include zero-fare public transport within the city. Period tickets may be for a particular route (in both directions), or for a whole network. A free travel pass allowing free and unlimited travel within a system is sometimes granted to particular social sectors, for example students, elderly, children, employees (job ticket) and the physically or mentally disabled.

Zero-fare public transport services are funded in full by means other than collecting a fare from passengers, normally through heavy subsidy or commercial sponsorship by businesses. Several mid-size European cities and many smaller towns around the world have converted their entire bus networks to zero-fare. Three capital cities in Europe have free public transport: Tallinn, Luxembourg and as of 2025, Belgrade. Local zero-fare shuttles or inner-city loops are far more common than city-wide systems. There are also zero-fare airport circulators and university transportation systems.

==== Revenue, profit and subsidies ====
Governments frequently opt to subsidize public transport for social, environmental or economic reasons. Common motivations include the desire to provide transport to people who are unable to use an automobile and to reduce congestion, land use and automobile emissions.

Subsidies may take the form of direct payments for financially unprofitable services, but support may also include indirect subsidies. For example, the government may allow free or reduced-cost use of state-owned infrastructure such as railways and roads, to stimulate public transport's economic competitiveness over private transport, that normally also has free infrastructure (subsidized through such things as gas taxes). Other subsidies include tax advantages (for instance aviation fuel is typically not taxed), bailouts if companies that are likely to collapse (often applied to airlines) and reduction of competition through licensing schemes (often applied to taxis and airlines). Private transport is normally subsidized indirectly through free roads and infrastructure, as well as incentives to build car factories and, on occasion, directly via bailouts of automakers. Subsidies also may take the form of initial or increased tolls for drivers, such as the San Francisco Bay Area raising tolls on numerous bridges and proposing more hikes to fund the Bay Area Rapid Transit system.

Land development schemes may be initialized, where operators are given the rights to use lands near stations, depots, or tracks for property development. For instance, in Hong Kong, the MTR Corporation Limited generates additional profits from land development to partially cover the cost of the construction of the urban rail system.

Some supporters of mass transit believe that use of taxpayer capital to fund mass transit will ultimately save taxpayer money in other ways, and therefore, state-funded mass transit is a benefit to the taxpayer. Some research has supported this position, but the measurement of benefits and costs is a complex and controversial issue. A lack of mass transit results in more traffic, pollution, and road construction to accommodate more vehicles, all costly to taxpayers; providing mass transit will therefore alleviate these costs.

A study found that support for public transport spending is much higher among conservatives who have high levels of trust in government officials than those who do not.

=== Digitalisation ===
The operation of public transport has been transformed by fleet digitalisation, evolving from manual processes to data-driven management systems. This evolution is happening with the deployment of Intelligent transportation systems (ITS) that enhance operational efficiency and the passenger experience.

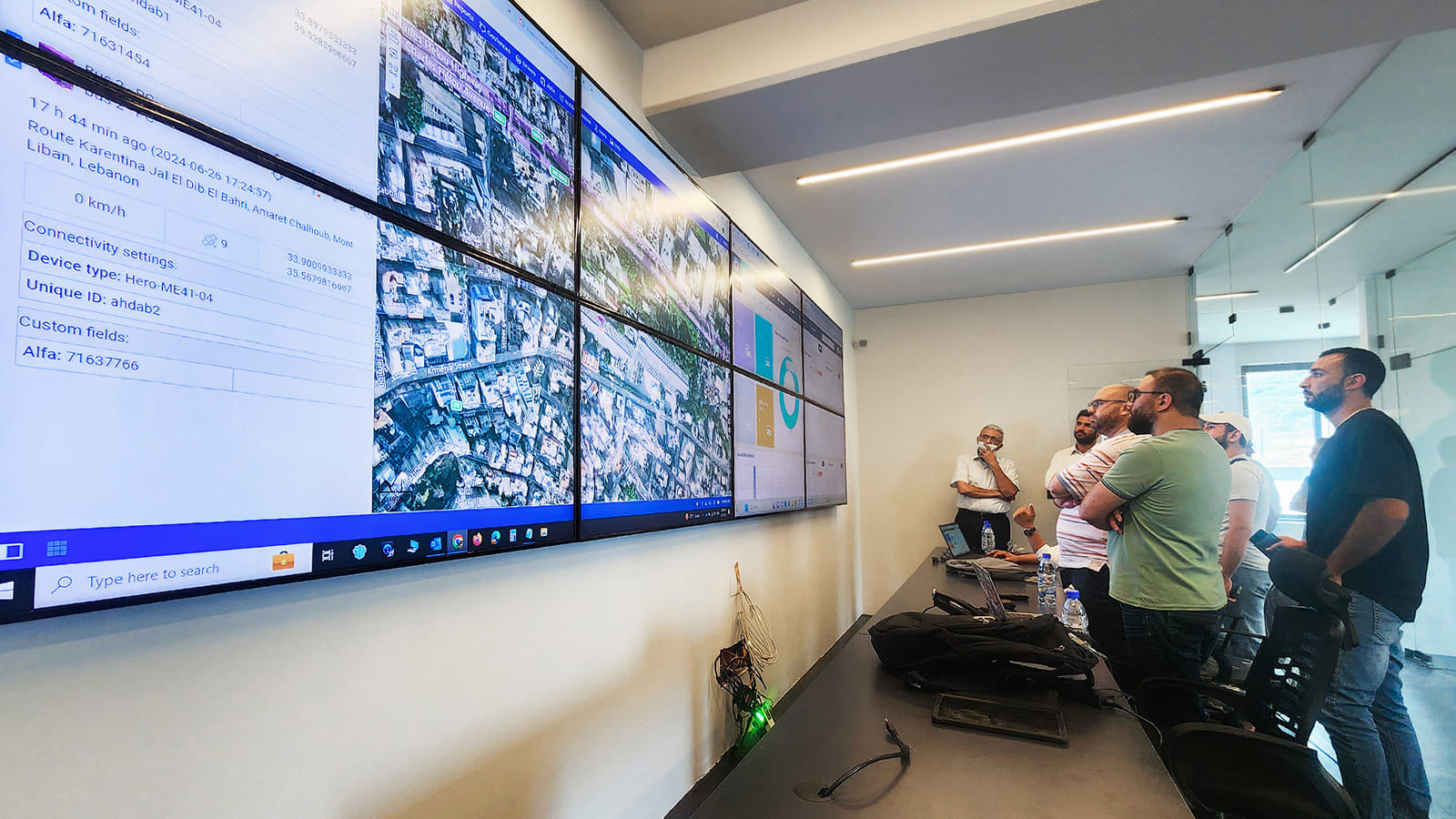
Real-time bus tracking control room in Lebanon

In public transportation, telematics systems use GPS devices to track the real-time positions of every vehicle in a fleet. This data is used for tools such as:

- Passenger information system: Operators calculate and share arrival and departure timetables with passengers through various channels, including mobile applications, websites, and digital displays at stations and stops.
- Transport Management Systems: Control centers use software to monitor the entire network in real time. This allows dispatchers to manage services, respond to disruptions (such as traffic congestion or vehicle breakdowns), and ensure schedules are maintained.
- Data Analytics for Service Planning: The data collected from AVL and ticketing systems provides insights into travel patterns. Transport authorities use this data to analyze demand, optimize routes and schedules, and plan network improvements.

=== Safety and security ===
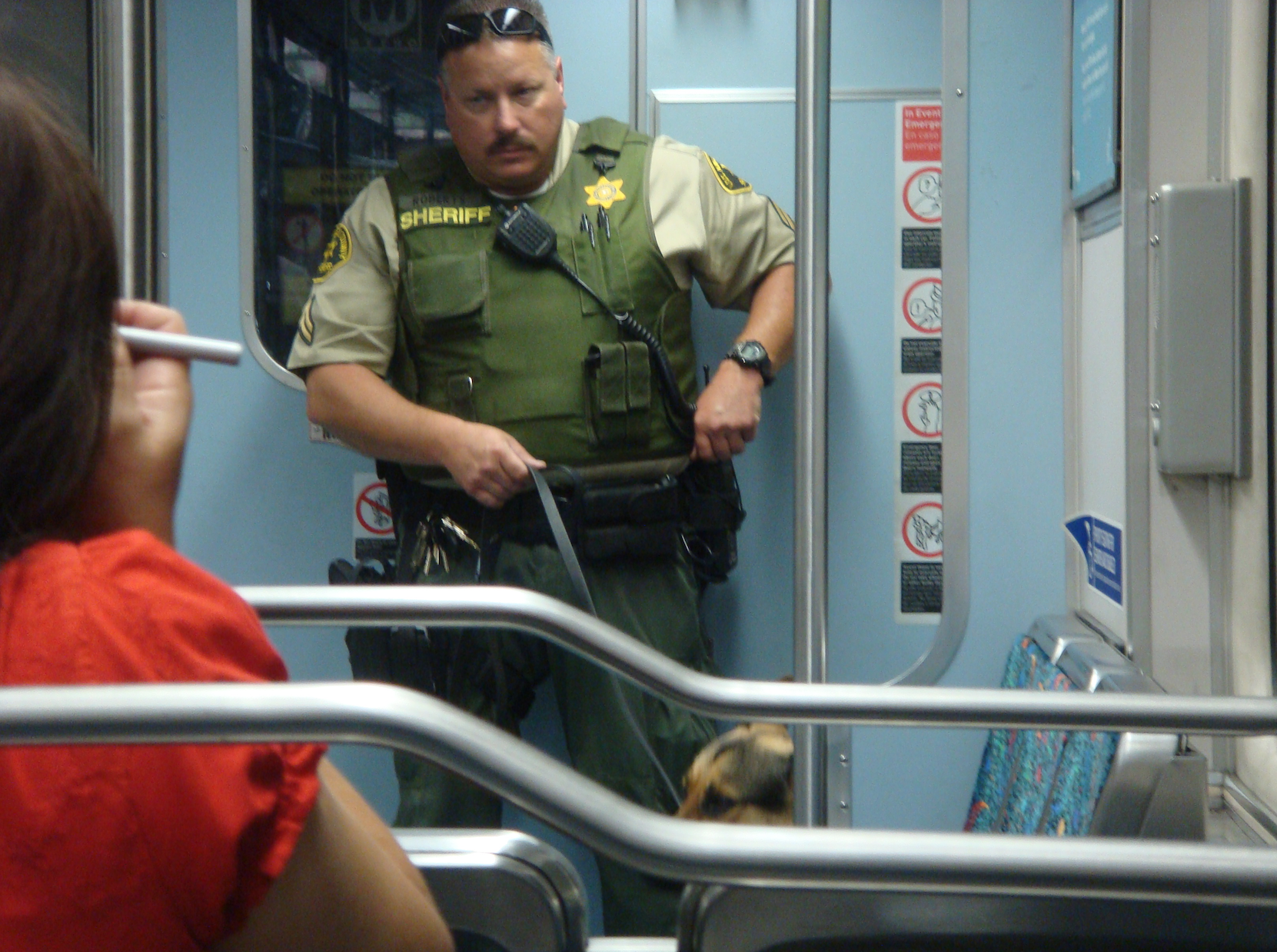
A LASD deputy and a police dog patrol a LA Metro light rail train

The injury and death rate due to crashes for public transit tends to be lower than that of automobile travel. A 2014 study noted that "residents of transit-oriented communities have about one-fifth the per capita crash casualty rate as in automobile-oriented communities".

Higher crime rates with public transport compared to automobile travel were found by a 2018 study in Netherlands. Some public transport systems attract vagrants who use the stations or trains as sleeping shelters. The safety and security of public transport varies by location and time.

== Impact ==
=== Accessibility ===
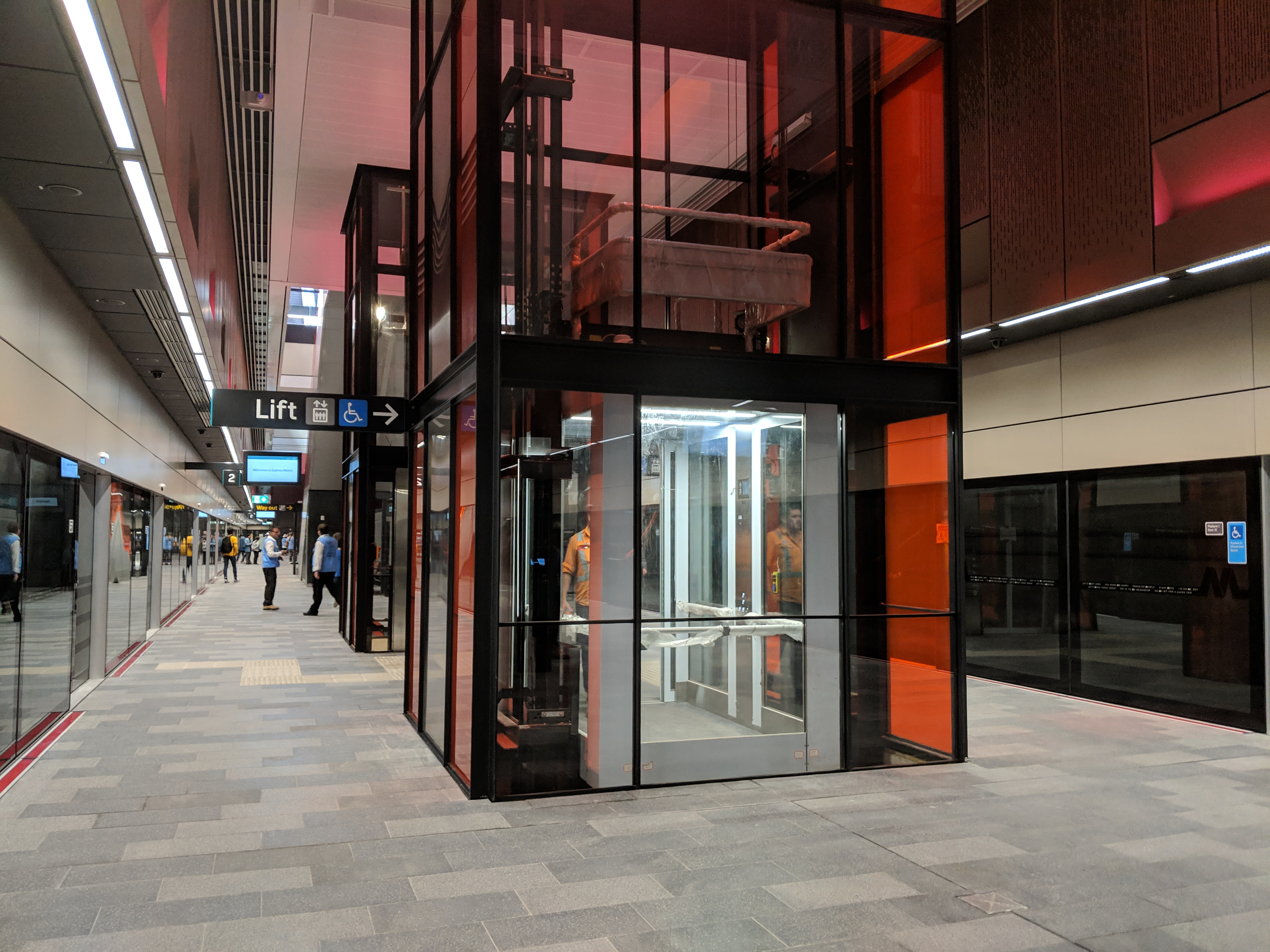
Sydney Metro Hills Showground station featuring a lift for disabled people.

Public transport is a means of independent transport for individuals (without walking or bicycling) such as children too young to drive, the elderly without access to cars, those who do not hold a drivers license, and the infirm such as wheelchair users. Kneeling buses and low-floor access boarding on buses and light rail have also enabled greater access for the disabled in mobility. In recent decades low-floor access has been incorporated into modern designs for vehicles. In economically deprived areas, public transport increases individual accessibility to transport where private means are unaffordable.

=== Environmental ===
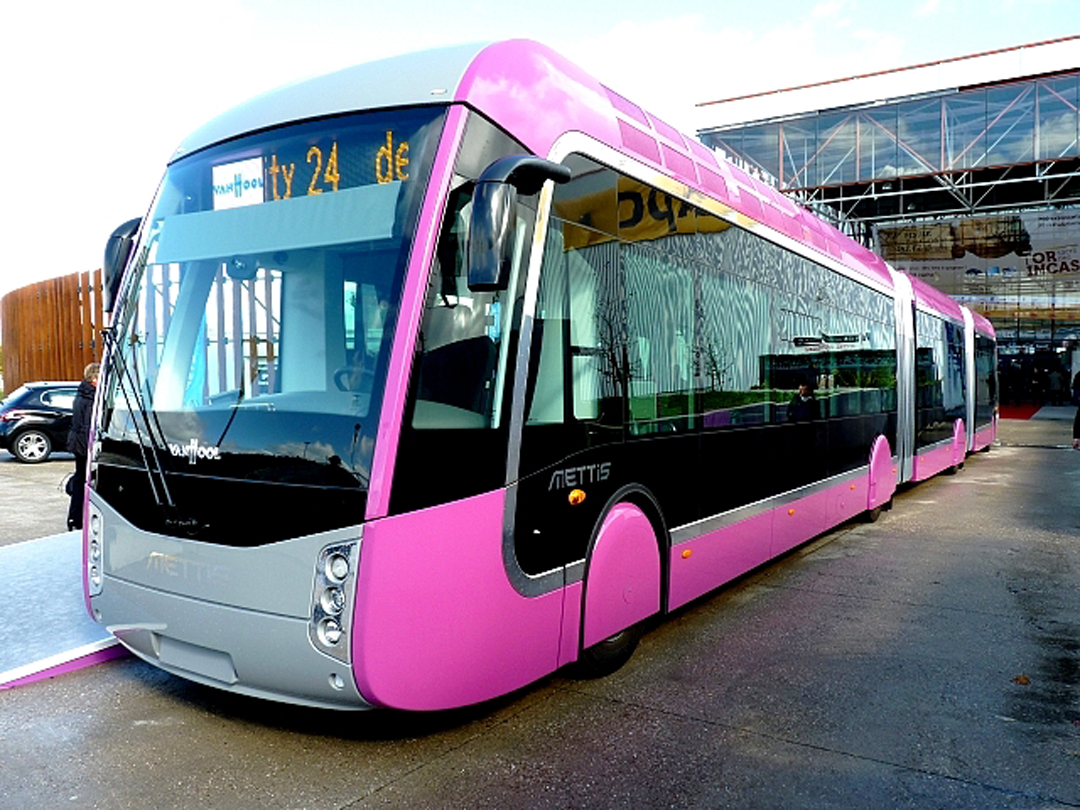
The pink bus rapid transit of Metz uses a diesel-electric hybrid driving system, developed by Belgian Van Hool manufacturer.

Although there is continuing debate as to the true efficiency of different modes of transportation, mass transit is generally regarded as significantly more energy efficient than other forms of travel. A 2002 study by the Brookings Institution and the American Enterprise Institute found that public transportation in the U.S. uses approximately half the fuel required by cars, SUVs and light trucks. In addition, the study noted that "private vehicles emit about 95 percent more carbon monoxide, 92 percent more volatile organic compounds and about twice as much carbon dioxide and nitrogen oxide than public vehicles for every passenger mile traveled".

Studies have shown that there is a strong inverse correlation between urban population density and energy consumption per capita, and that public transport could facilitate increased urban population densities, and thus reduce travel distances and fossil fuel consumption.

Supporters of the green movement usually advocate public transportation, because it offers decreased airborne pollution compared to automobiles transporting a single individual. A study conducted in Milan, Italy, in 2004 during and after a transportation strike serves to illustrate the impact that mass transportation has on the environment. Air samples were taken between 2 and 9 January, and then tested for methane, carbon monoxide, non-methane hydrocarbons (NMHCs), and other gases identified as harmful to the environment. The figure below is a computer simulation showing the results of the study "with 2 January showing the lowest concentrations as a result of decreased activity in the city during the holiday season. 9 January showed the highest NMHC concentrations because of increased vehicular activity in the city due to a public transportation strike."

Based on the benefits of public transport, the green movement has affected public policy. For example, the state of New Jersey released Getting to Work: Reconnecting Jobs with Transit. This initiative attempts to relocate new jobs into areas with higher public transportation accessibility. The initiative cites the use of public transportation as being a means of reducing traffic congestion, providing an economic boost to the areas of job relocation, and most importantly, contributing to a green environment by reducing carbon dioxide (CO_{2}) emissions.

A survey by the European Development Bank found that a majority of Europeans wanted to prioritize public transit in Climate change mitigation policies.

Using public transportation can result in a reduction of an individual's carbon footprint. A single person, 20-mile (32 km) round trip by car can be replaced using public transportation and result in a net CO_{2} emissions reduction of 4,800 pounds (2,200 kg) per year. Using public transportation saves CO_{2} emissions in more ways than simply travel as public transportation can help to alleviate traffic congestion as well as promote more efficient land use. When all three of these are considered, it is estimated that 37 million metric tons of CO_{2} will be saved annually. Another study claims that using public transit instead of private in the U.S. in 2005 would have reduced CO_{2} emissions by 3.9 million metric tons and that the resulting traffic congestion reduction accounts for an additional 3.0 million metric tons of CO_{2} saved. This is a total savings of about 6.9 million metric tons per year given the 2005 values.

In order to compare energy impact of public transportation to private transportation, the amount of energy per passenger mile must be calculated. The reason that comparing the energy expenditure per person is necessary is to normalize the data for easy comparison. Here, the units are in per 100 p-km (read as person kilometer or passenger kilometer). In terms of energy consumption, public transportation is better than individual transport in a personal vehicle. In England, bus and rail are popular methods of public transportation, especially in London. Rail provides rapid movement into and out of the city of London while busing helps to provide transport within the city itself. As of 2006–2007, the total energy cost of London's trains was 15 kWh per 100 p-km, about 5 times better than a personal car.

For busing in London, it was 32 kWh per 100 p-km, or about 2.5 times less than that of a personal car. This includes lighting, depots, inefficiencies due to capacity (i.e., the train or bus may not be operating at full capacity at all times), and other inefficiencies. Efficiencies of transport in Japan in 1999 were 68 kWh per 100 p-km for a personal car, 19 kWh per 100 p-km for a bus, 6 kWh per 100 p-km for rail, 51 kWh per 100 p-km for air, and 57 kWh per 100 p-km for sea. These numbers from either country can be used in energy comparison calculations or life-cycle assessment calculations.

Public transportation also provides an arena to test environmentally friendly fuel alternatives, such as hydrogen-powered vehicles. Swapping out materials to create lighter public transportation vehicles with the same or better performance will increase environmental friendliness of public transportation vehicles while maintaining current standards or improving them.

In the 2023 study titled "Subways and CO_{2} Emissions: A Global Analysis with Satellite Data," research reveals that subway systems significantly reduce CO_{2} emissions by approximately 50% in the cities they serve, contributing to an 11% global reduction. The study also explores potential expansion in 1,214 urban areas lacking subways, suggesting a potential emission cut by up to 77%. Economically, subways are viable in 794 cities under optimistic financial conditions (SCC at US$150/ton and SIC at US$140 million/km), but this figure drops to 294 cities with more pessimistic assumptions. Despite high costs—about US$200 million per kilometer for construction—subways offer substantial co-benefits, such as reduced traffic congestion and improved public health, making them a strategic investment for urban sustainability and climate mitigation.

In the climate policies of many developing countries, public transport receives less attention and less investment than its climate and other environmental benefits would merit. For example, public transport is largely absent from the nationally determined contributions of the ASEAN member states, with a combined population of around 700 million.

==== Electric public transit efficiency ====
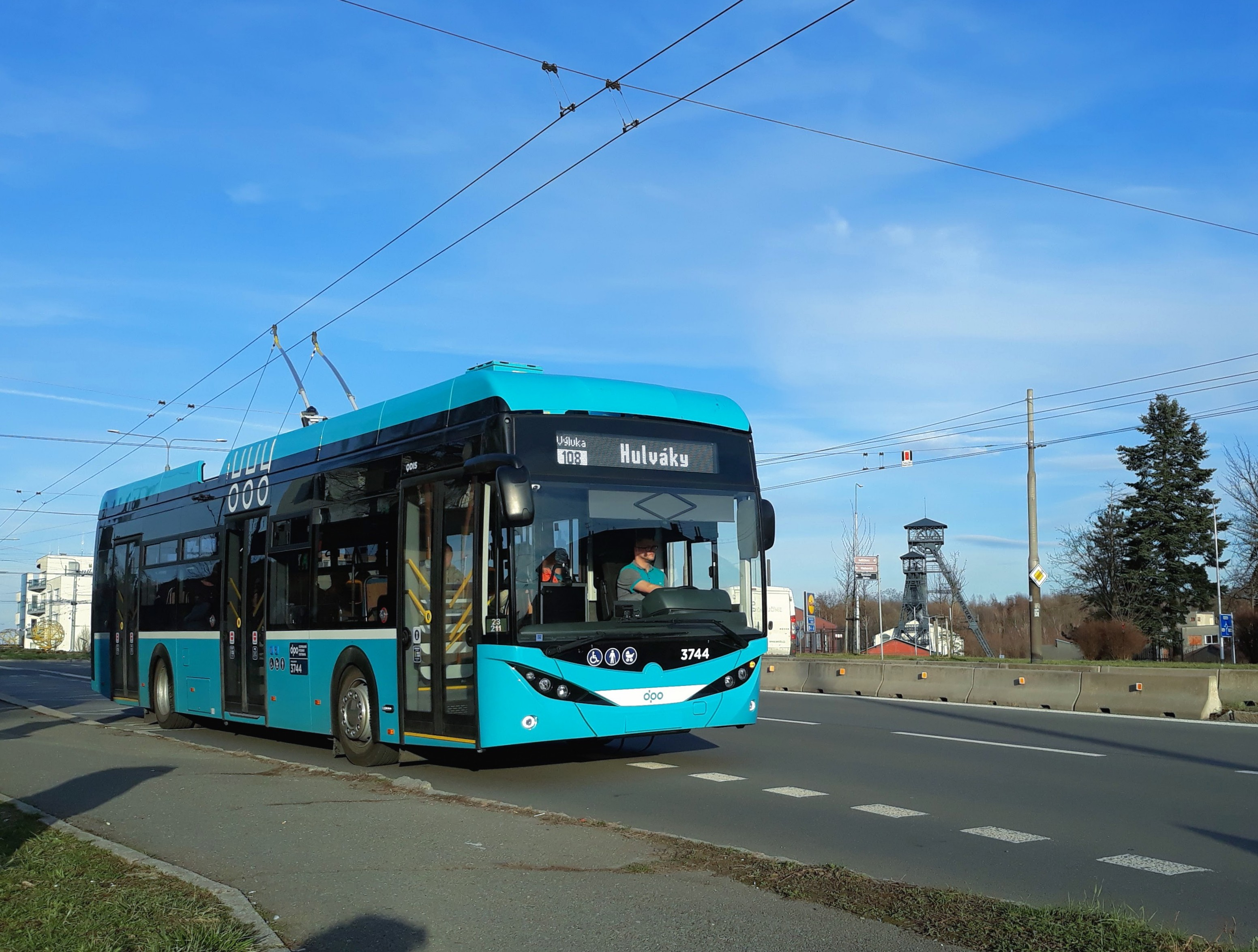
One of the few trolleybuses in Europe, this trolleybus uses two overhead wires to provide electric current supply and return to the power source

Shifts from private to public transport (train, trolleybus, personal rapid transit or tram) have the potential for large gains in efficiency in terms of an individual's distance traveled per kWh.

Research shows people prefer trams to buses, because they are quieter and more comfortable and perceived as having higher status. Therefore, it may be possible to cut liquid fossil fuel consumption in cities through the use of electric trams. Trams may be the most energy-efficient form of public transportation, with rubber-wheeled vehicles using two-thirds more energy than the equivalent tram, and run on electricity rather than fossil fuels.

In terms of net present value, they are also the cheapest – Blackpool trams are still running after 100 years, but combustion buses only last about 15 years.

=== Land use ===
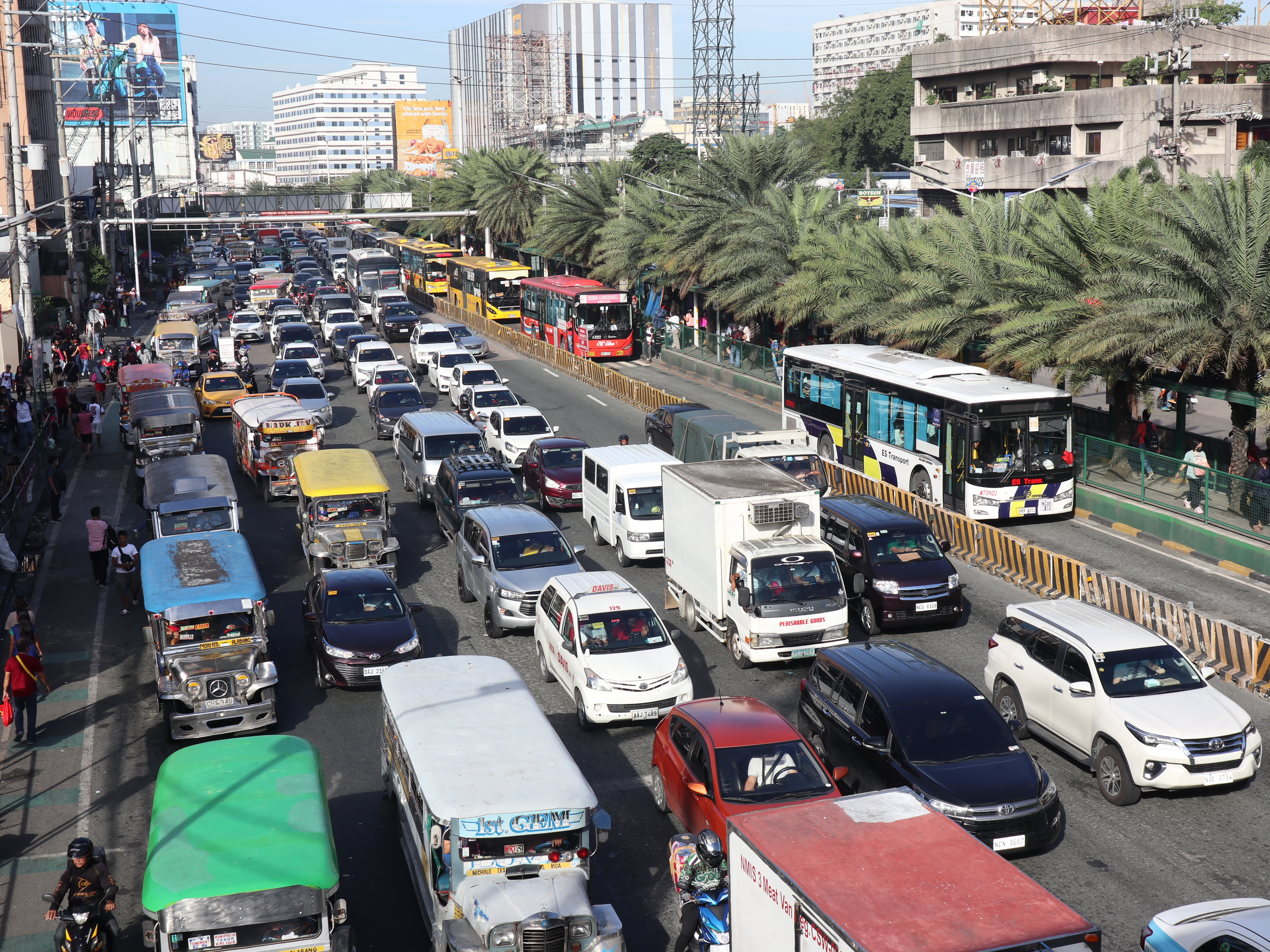
Traffic jam in Manila, Philippines. Buses use separate lanes to avoid congested roads.

Dense areas with mixed-land uses promote daily public transport use while urban sprawl is associated with sporadic public transport use. A recent European multi-city survey found that dense urban environments, reliable and affordable public transport services, and limiting motorized vehicles in high density areas of the cities will help achieve much needed promotion of public transport use.

Urban space is a precious commodity and public transport utilises it more efficiently than a car dominant society, allowing cities to be built more compactly than if they were dependent on automobile transport. If public transport planning is at the core of urban planning, it will also force cities to be built more compactly to create efficient feeds into the stations and stops of transport. This will at the same time allow the creation of centers around the hubs, serving passengers' daily commercial needs and public services. This approach significantly reduces urban sprawl. Public land planning for public transportation can be difficult but it is the State and Regional organizations that are responsible to planning and improving public transportation roads and routes. With public land prices booming, there must be a plan to using the land most efficiently for public transportation in order to create better transportation systems. Inefficient land use and poor planning leads to a decrease in accessibility to jobs, education, and health care.

=== Societal ===
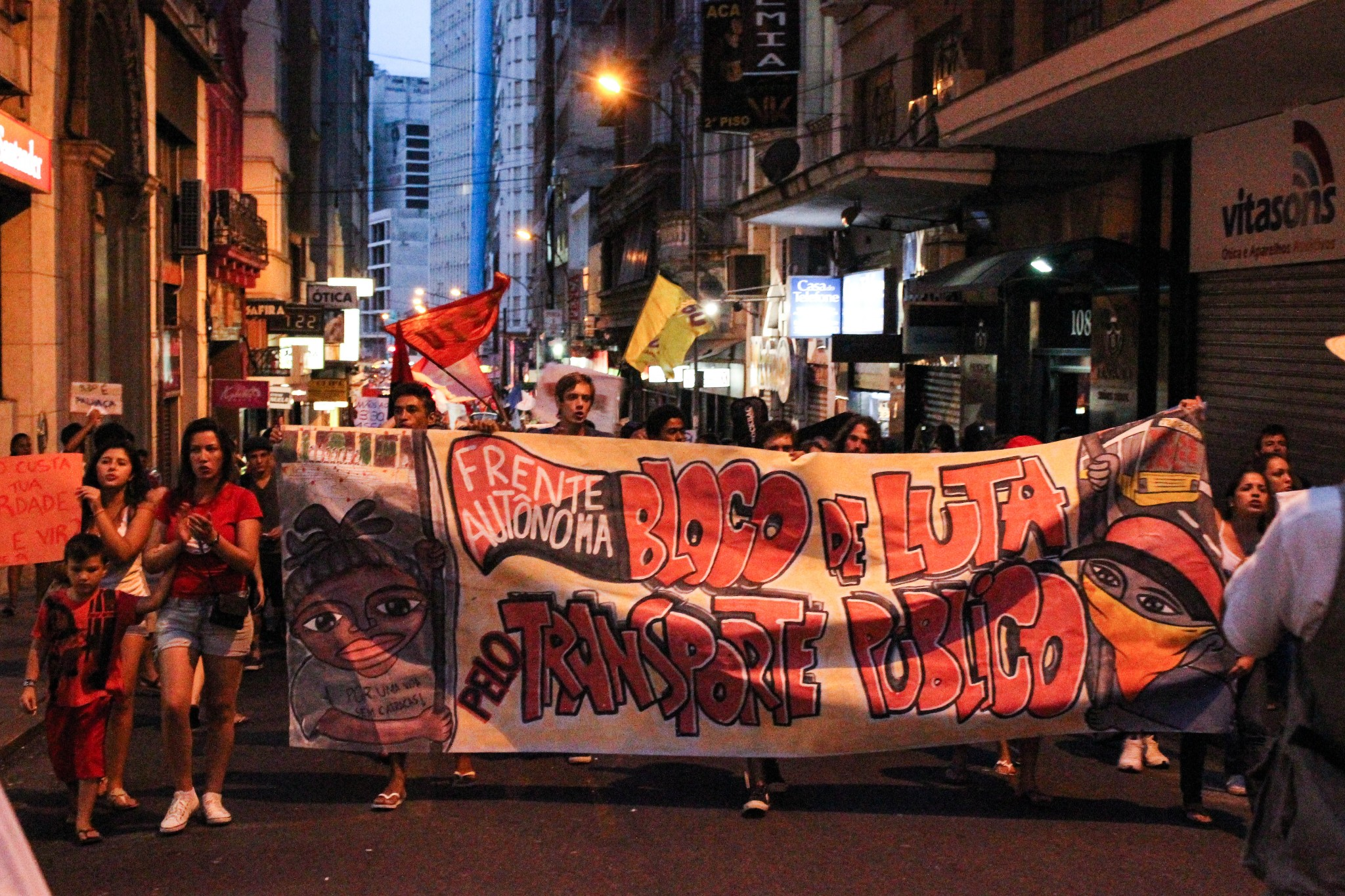
Protests in Porto Alegre against increases of bus fare prices

A developed country is not a place where the poor have cars; it's where the rich use public transport —Enrique Peñalosa, former mayor of Bogotá

The consequences for wider society and civic life, is public transport breaks down social and cultural barriers between people in public life. An important social role played by public transport is to ensure that all members of society are able to travel without walking or cycling, not just those with a driving license and access to an automobile—which include groups such as the young, the old, the poor, those with medical conditions, and people banned from driving. Automobile dependency is a name given by policy makers to places where those without access to a private vehicle do not have access to independent mobility. This dependency contributes to the transport divide. A 2018 study published in the Journal of Environmental Economics and Management concluded that expanded access to public transit has no meaningful impact on automobile volume in the long term.

Above that, public transportation opens to its users the possibility of meeting other people, as no concentration is diverted from interacting with fellow-travelers due to any steering activities. Adding to the above-said, public transport becomes a location of inter-social encounters across all boundaries of social, ethnic and other types of affiliation.

== Social issues ==
=== Impact of COVID-19 pandemic ===
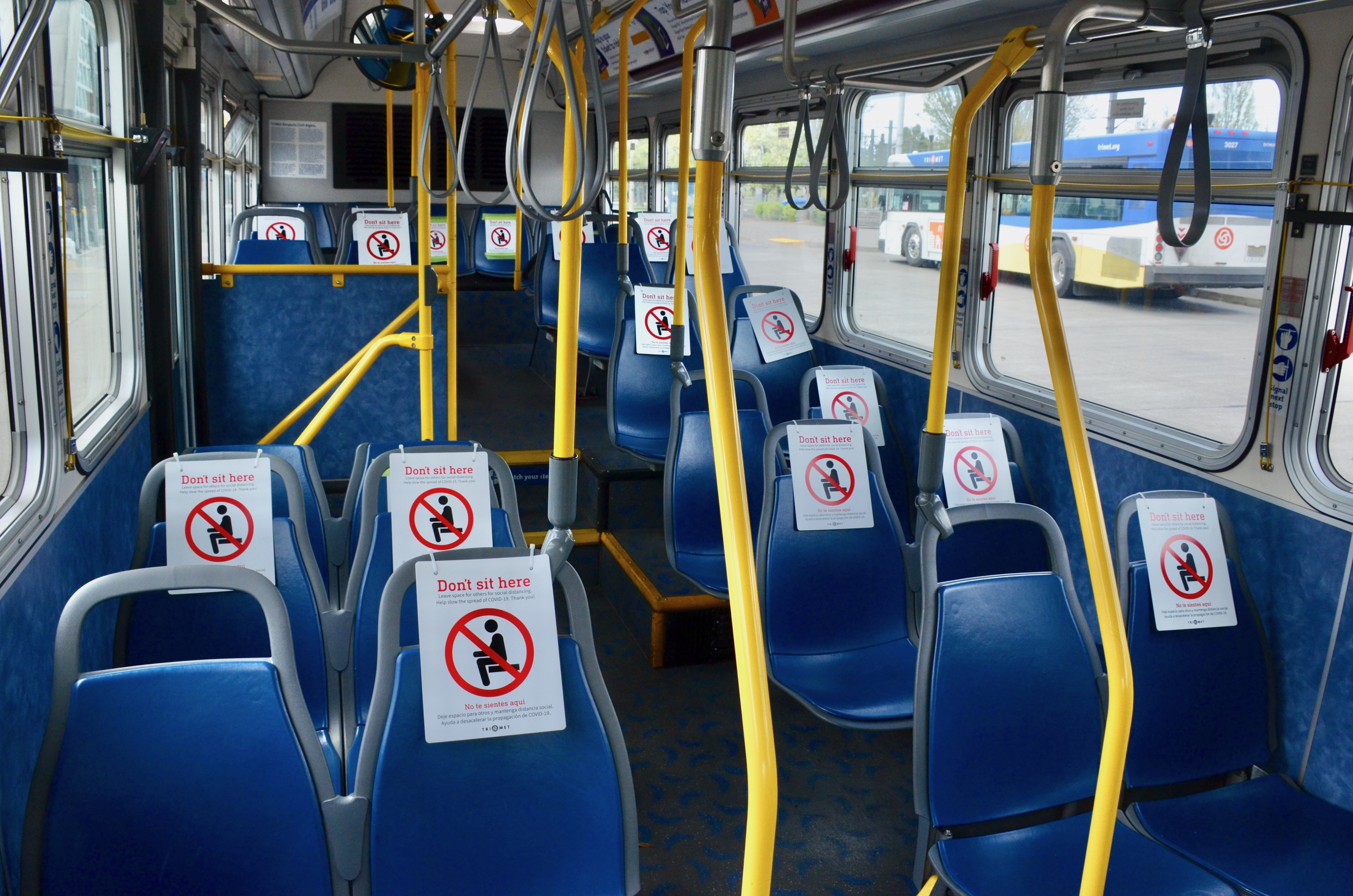
TriMet bus seats marked with signs encouraging social distancing during the COVID-19 pandemic.

The COVID-19 pandemic had a substantial effect on public transport systems, infrastructures and revenues in various cities across the world. The pandemic negatively impacted public transport usage by imposing social distancing, remote work, or unemployment. In the United States it caused a 79% drop in public transport riders at the beginning of 2020. This trend continued throughout the year with a 65% reduced ridership as compared to previous years. Similarly in London, at the beginning of 2020, ridership in the London Underground and buses declined by 95% and 85% respectively.

A 55% drop in public transport ridership as compared to 2019 was reported in Cairo, Egypt after a period of mandatory halt. To reduce COVID-spread through cash contact, in Nairobi, Kenya, cashless payment systems were enforced by National Transport and Safety Authority (NTSA). Public transport was halted for three months in 2020 in Kampala, Uganda with people resorting to walking or cycling. Post-quarantine, upon renovating public transport infrastructure, public transport such as minibus taxis were assigned specific routes. The situation was difficult in cities where people are heavily dependent on the public transport system. In Kigali, Rwanda social distancing requirements led to fifty percent occupancy restrictions, but as the pandemic situation improved, the occupancy limit was increased to meet popular demands. Addis Ababa, Ethiopia also had inadequate bus services relative to demand and longer wait times due to social distancing restrictions and planned to deploy more buses. Both Addis Ababa and Kampala aim to improve walking and cycling infrastructures in the future as means of commuting complementary to buses.

== See also ==
- Deutschlandticket
- Finnish models of public transport
- Free public transport
- Health impact of light rail systems
- International Association of Public Transport
- List of tram and light rail transit systems
- List of urban transit advocacy organisations
- Outline of public transport
- Passenger load factor
- Patronage (transport)
- Private transport
- Public transport accessibility level
- Public transport bus service
- Public transport route planner
- Public transport timetable
- Rail pass
- Sustainable transport
- Transit district
- Transit pass
- Transit police
- Transit watchdog
- Transport divide
- Transportation engineering
