= Railroad Pass =

Railroad Pass can refer to:

== Railway passes ==
- A rail pass that can be used to travel on a railway, usually for a specific period of time rather than specific place. These include:
  - The Eurail Pass / The Interrail Pass (Europe)
  - The Japan Rail Pass (Japan)
  - The Korea Rail Pass (South Korea)
  - The Indrail Pass (India)
  - The TR Pass (Taiwan)
  - Various concessionary fares on the British railway network
    - The BritRail Pass, available only to those who do not reside in the United Kingdom (see Rail transport in Great Britain)
  - Other season tickets

== Mountain passes ==
- Railroad Pass (Mohave County, Arizona), a mountain pass in the United States northwest of Willcox, Arizona
- Railroad Pass (Cochise County, Arizona), a mountain pass in the United States at Kingman, Arizona
- Railroad Pass (Nevada), a mountain pass in the city of Henderson, Nevada, United States
- Railroad Pass (British Columbia), a mountain pass in Canada's province of British Columbia

== Casino ==
- Railroad Pass Casino, Nevada (opened on August 1, 1931, oldest operating casino in Nevada)
