= TR Pass =

Taiwan Railway Administration rail pass

The TR Pass (Chinese: 台灣鐵路周遊券; pinyin: Táiwān Tiělù Zhōuyóu Quàn) is a rail pass offered by Taiwan Railway Administration (TRA), granting holders of the pass unlimited rides on trains operated by TRA within the day count. The pass can be used by both local and foreign travelers, and different durations of validity are offered as choice. There are two versions of the pass, i.e. the General Pass and the Student Pass. While holders of the former could travel with all types of trains operated by TRA, holders of the latter have more limitations of choice, albeit with a benefit of lowered price. Taiwan High Speed Rail and other privately run rail lines are not covered by the pass, as they are not run by TRA.

== Name ==
The official name of the pass is the TR Pass, a name imitating the JR Pass offered by JR Group. But, while "JR Pass" is a short-hand of its official full name "Japan Rail Pass", "TR Pass" is seldom referred to as "Taiwan Rail Pass"; TRA refers to it as "TR Pass" in all situations.

There is no official Chinese name for the General Pass, and most Chinese-speaking travelers simply refer to it as the TR Pass, even in a Chinese dialogue. But some people call it "台灣鐵路周遊券", mimicking the Chinese name of JR Pass ("日本鐵路週遊券"), because the English name of the pass is also an imitation of "JR Pass".

Although currently TRA also refers to the Student Pass as "TR Pass學生版" (lit. "TR Pass - Student Version") in Chinese, in the past TRA often refers to it as "學生優惠周遊券" (lit. "Student Concessionary Pass").

== History ==
Act according to the policy of National Youth Commission, Executive Yuan (行政院青年輔導委員會), TRA aimed at encouraging foreign students to travel in Taiwan by issuing the TR Pass in December 2006; this explains why at that time only foreign students were eligible to buy and use the pass. In order to encourage tourism by railway and provide an opportunity of travel as a leisure activity to local students in vacation, TRA extended the scheme to local students in 2009. Starting from 1 July 2009, 5-Day and 7-Day TR Student Pass have been available to local students in summer and winter vacation, although the 10-Day version was still exclusively available to foreign students.

Before the issuing of TR Pass, TRA had been issuing a rail pass called "環島週遊票" (lit. "Round-the-Island Pass") since 1 March 1998. The pass was issued so as to promote local tourism, upon adopting the 5-day work-week policy in government at that time. The pass offered a roughly 15% discount (comparing to the price of Tze-Chiang Train, the fastest train run by TRA) and unlimited travel with trains in 15 days. However, the pass did not draw much attention, as it had too many restrictions. First, holders of the pass must either travel in the clockwise or anti-clockwise direction without traveling backwards (even if they miss a stop). Secondly, travelers could only pick seven stops to get off and visit. Once a traveler has got off in seven stations, the pass became invalid. These restrictions were deemed too restrictive and limited the use of the pass.

Therefore, starting from 12 July 2010, TRA extended the TR Pass scheme to non-students, replacing the Round-the-Island Pass with General TR Pass, after studying how JR Pass (Japan) and KR Pass (South Korea) work. The General Pass, unlike the Student Pass, could be brought by everyone. The precious restrictions of the Round-the-Island Pass were waived, so that the new pass became more attractive.

== Rail Pass ==
Unlike rail passes in some other countries (e.g. InterRail Pass, Japan Rail Pass or Korea Rail Pass), or even THSR Pass in same country Taiwan, TR Pass is available also to local people. Both General Pass and Student Pass are offered; while the General Pass is valid for all classes of trains (excluding some trains specially designated by TRA), the Student Pass is only valid for Chu-Kuang Train (莒光號) or slower trains. Passengers using the Student Pass cannot ride on Tze-Chiang Train (自強號), the fastest and most frequent trains operated by TRA, and other trains at the same level, even by paying the price difference between the pass and a single-trip ticket; a full-fare separate ticket would be needed instead. Taiwan High Speed Rail and those privately run rail lines, e.g. the Alishan Forest Railway, are not covered by both versions of the pass, as they are not operated by TRA.

Another difference between the two versions concerns seats reservation. While the General Pass can reserve on all types of trains, the Student Pass cannot reserve seats even for Chu-Kuang Train or other slow trains. But although the reservation could be made by the General Pass, it could reserve only a train with the same route per day, i.e. one cannot book two different trains running in the same day.

The Student Pass is available for foreign students (except those with long-term residence in Taiwan) throughout the year, but Taiwan students can only buy the pass in summer and winter vacation. Foreign students can buy the pass seven days in advance, while local student can only buy it three days beforehand. The 10-day Student Pass is exclusively for foreign students, so local students can only purchase the 5-Day and 7-Day Pass, which are also available to foreign students.

All versions of the pass must be used in consecutive days, and lost pass would not be re-issued.

There are concessionary ticket and group ticket for the General Pass. Concessionary tickets are available for the elderly, children and disables. Group ticket can be used by up to four people travelling together at a fixed price. Price remains the same if it is used by just two or three persons.

The prices of the pass in new Taiwan dollar are listed as follows.

Pass	Type of Pass	3 Days	5 Days	7 Days	10 Days
General	Standard	NT$1,800	NT$2,500	—	—
General	Concessionary	NT$900	NT$1,250	—	—
General	Group Pass for up to 4 Persons	NT$4,200	NT$7,000	—	—
Student	—	—	NT$599	NT$799	NT$1098

== Limitations ==
All versions of the pass cannot be used during the Lunar New Year period, when the demand for trains is very high.

As standing is not allowed in Taroko Express and Puyuma Express, seat reservation is compulsory even with the pass.

== Eligibility ==
Foreign students should buy their pass by showing their passport with an International Student Identity Card or a Youth Travel Card. Local students or Taiwan students studying aboard could buy their pass with their Student ID Card. There is no age limit for the Student Pass, so adult students are still eligible.

== See also ==
- JR Pass
- KR Pass
