= Pendolino =

Italian family of tilting trains

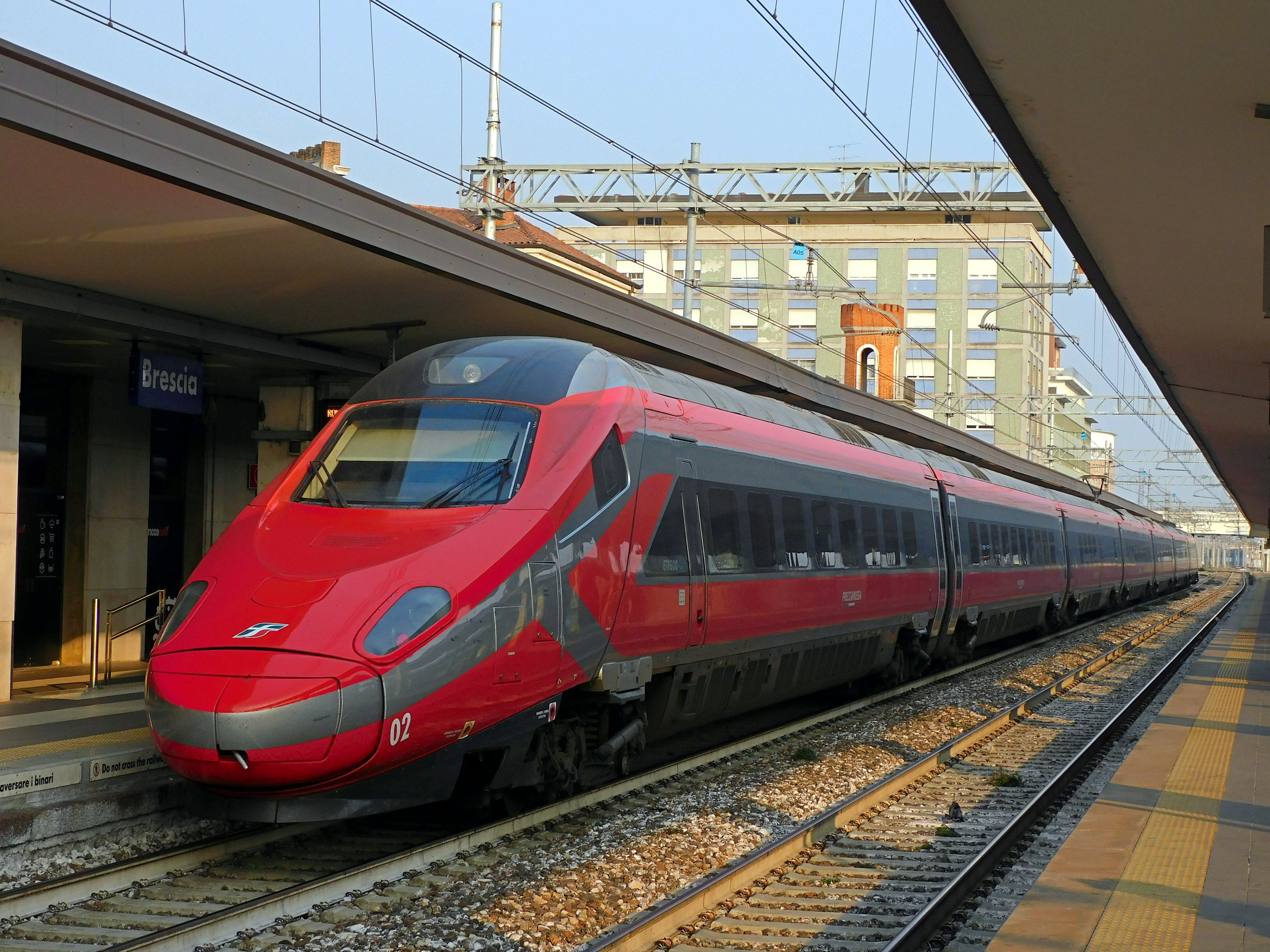
An ETR 600 high-speed train, operated by Trenitalia in 2023

Pendolino (from Italian pendolo [ˈpɛndolo] "pendulum", and -ino, a diminutive suffix) is an Italian family of high-speed tilting trains (and non-tilting) used in Italy, Spain, Germany, Poland, Portugal, Slovenia, Finland, the Czech Republic, Slovakia (operated by Czech railways), the UK, the US, Switzerland, China, and Greece. It was also used in Russia from December 12, 2010, until March 26, 2022. Based on the design of the Italian ETR 401, it was further developed and manufactured by Fiat Ferroviaria, which was later acquired by Alstom in 2000.

The idea of a tilting train became popular in the 1960s and 1970s, when various rail operators, impressed by the high-speed rail services being introduced in France and Japan, wondered how they could similarly speed up travel without building a dedicated parallel rail network (as those two countries were doing). By tilting, the train could go around curves designed for slower trains at higher speeds without causing undue discomfort to passengers. Another example of a tilting train, successive to the Pendolino, was the British Rail Class 370.

== Current use ==
=== Italy ===
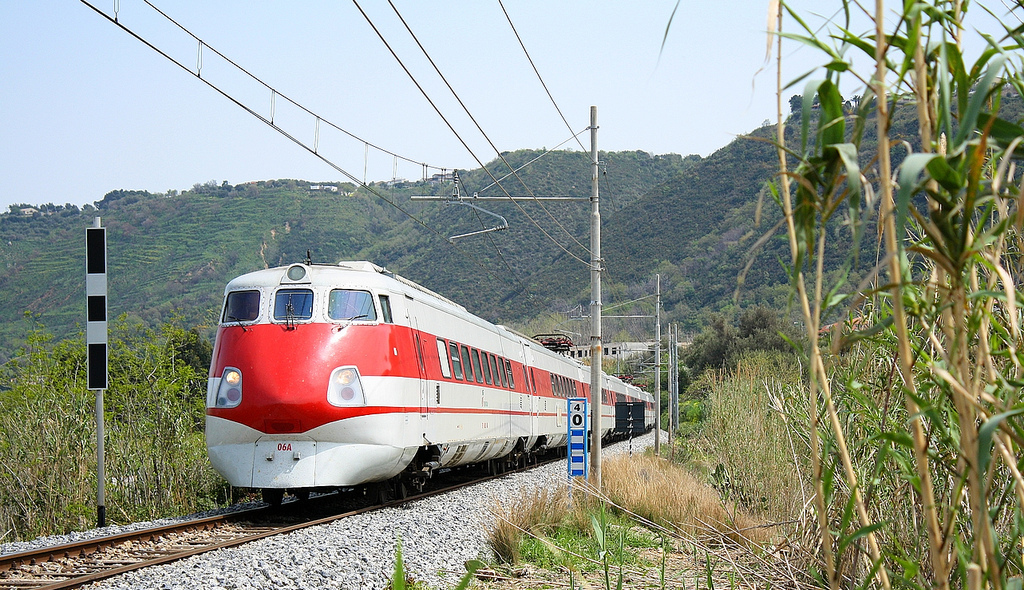
The ETR 450 was the first production Pendolino train, in service from 1988 to 2015.

In Italy, various possibilities were explored (including one early design for fixed carriages with tilting seats). A number of prototypes were built and tested, including an automotrice (self-propelled) derived from ALn 668 diesel car and provided with tilting seats. The first working prototype using a tilting carbody was ETR Y 0160, an electrically powered car launched by Fiat in 1969. This was the first to be christened Pendolino.

It led to the construction of a whole EMU in 1975, the ETR 401, built in two units by FIAT. One was put into public service on 2 July 1976 on the Rome-Ancona (later extended to Rimini) line, operated by Italian State Railways. Between Roma and Ancona (km. 295) the train took 2 hours and 50 minutes while the ordinary trains took 3 hours and 30 minutes. The train had four cars and was mostly considered a travelling laboratory for the new technology. The second unit was adapted for service to the broad gauge Renfe Spanish lines.

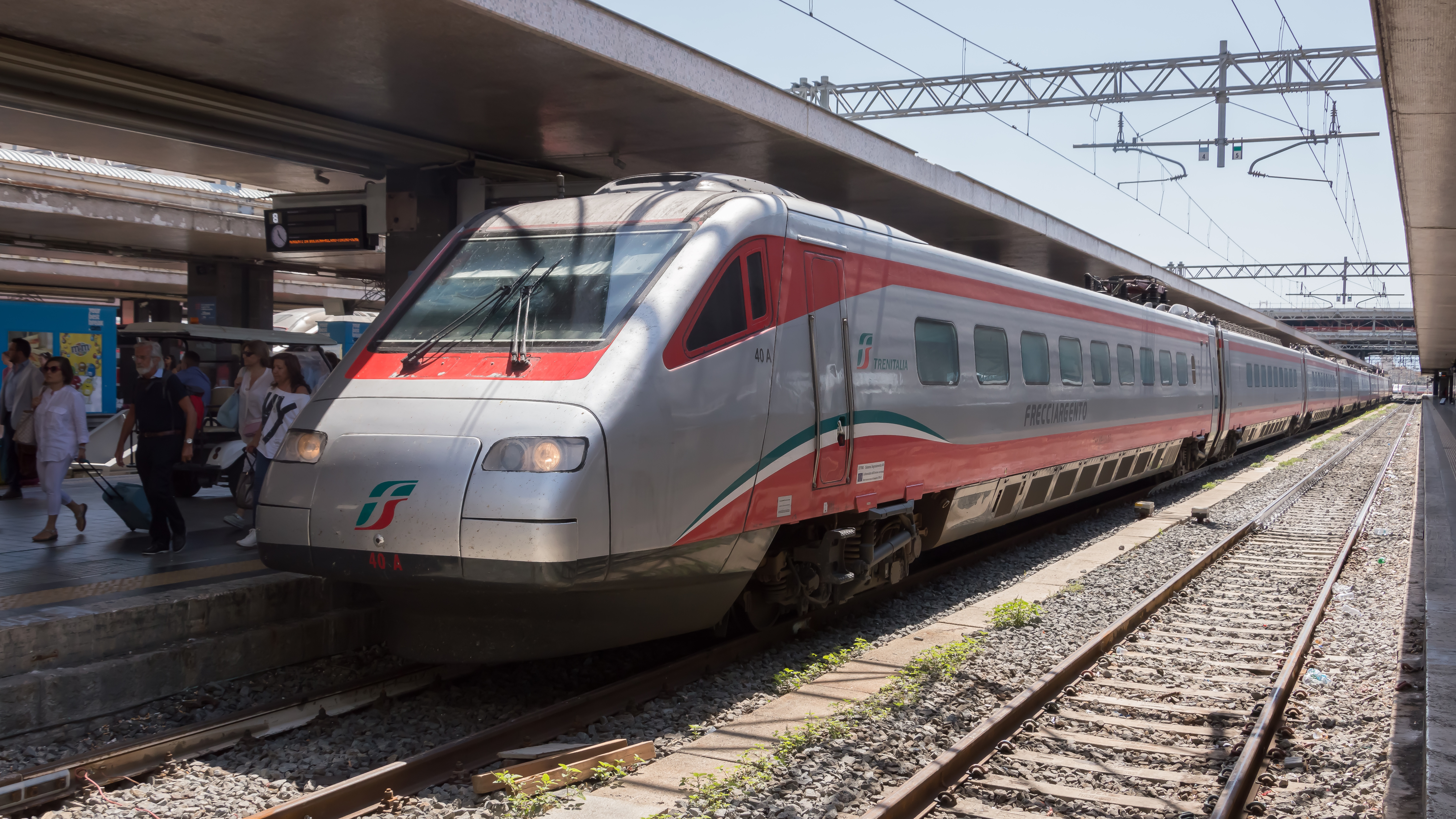
ETR 485 at Roma Termini railway station

In 1982, FS retired the ETR 401 from service, due to high maintenance cost, and FIAT transformed it in a train-laboratory, to test the parts for the successor of the ETR 401, ETR 450. After 1988, the trainset went around Europe to demonstrate the greatness of the tilting revolutionary technology and between 1994 and 2001 it was utilised as a charter train. In 2001 the ETR 401 was put aside in Ancona and since 2013, to celebrate the 25th anniversary of the first official pendolino service, it has been partly restored.

On 29 May 1988, the ETR 450 became the first pendolino to enter in a high-speed regular service in the world. The new train was similar to its predecessor, utilising many electronic parts such as the chopper and the automatic gear.

Characterized by a nine-car configuration, the 15 ETR 450 trainsets could run the Rome-Milan line in under four hours, at speeds up to 250 km/h (160 mph), with a comfort level same as the best TEE's cars at the speed of 180–200 km/h (110–120 mph). Passenger numbers increased from 220,000 in 1988 to 2.2 million in 1993.

In 1994, the next generation, the ETR 460, styled by Giorgetto Giugiaro, began service. Though plagued by technical teething problems, the ETR 460 introduced several innovations, such as more powerful AC asynchronous motors. Further, the pistons actuating the anti-tilting action were placed in the bogie instead of on the carbody sides: this permitted the reorganisation of the vestibules and passenger compartment areas, improving comfort. The bogie-to-body connection is extremely simple and easy to make, with clear advantages for maintenance.

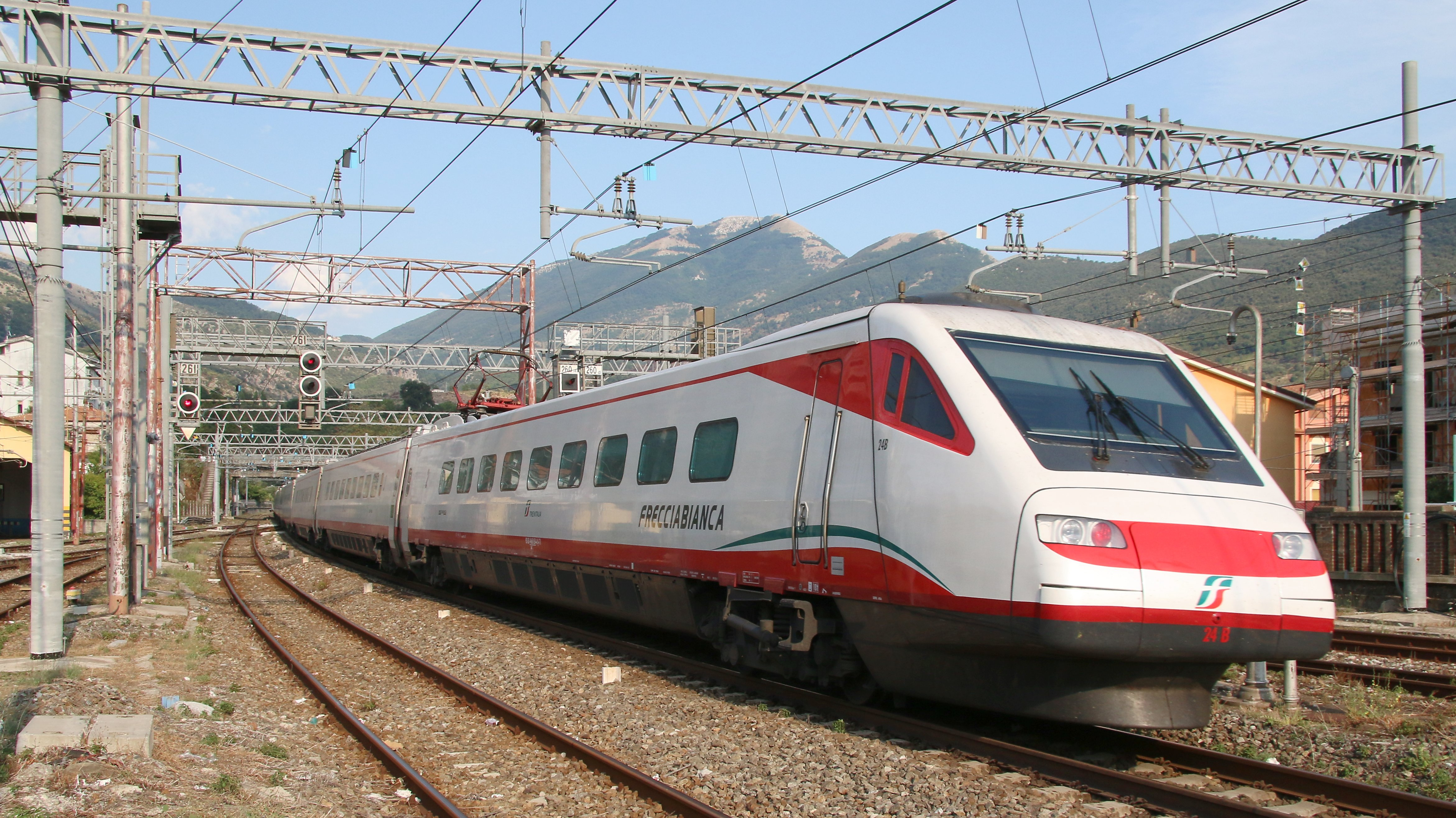
An ETR 460 of Trenitalia at Sapri

ETR 460 keeps axle load to an extremely low level (14.5 ton/axle) to allow the train to negotiate curves up to 35% faster than conventional intercity trains (loco plus coaches). The body, which exploits large aluminium extrusion technology, has substantial modularity and allows for extremely low axle weight, whilst fully respecting the highest safety standards, and allows the best exploitation of the space with different loading gauges.

Fiat Ferroviaria built only ten ETR 460 trainsets. Improved versions include nine ETR 470 built for the Italo-Swiss Cisalpino company and 15 ETR 480 / 485 used by Trenitalia under AC lines such as those in France and Switzerland. A total of 34 EMUs of the ETR 460/470/480 - 485 series were built.

Fiat Ferroviaria was sold to Alstom in 2000. The development of the Pendolino technology continued in Alstom's Italian factories and the next generation, the New Pendolino, was delivered to Trenitalia and Cisalpino, as the ETR 600 and the ETR 610, from 2006.

=== Spain ===
Even before the first Pendolino EMU was built in Italy, in 1972, Fiat and Renfe signed an agreement for cooperation in tilting-train development. The first fruit of the cooperation was the equipment of a Renfe Class 432 EMU with the active tilting suspension in September 1972. After successful tests, Spanish trainmaker CAF and Fiat built a prototype similar to the ETR 401, which was delivered in 1976 as Renfe Class 443, nicknamed Platanito (Little banana) for its yellow livery. The four-car train had a commercial top speed of 180 km/h (110 mph) and achieved a then speed record for Spain of 206 km/h (128 mph) on 6 May 1987. However, the train remained a unique specimen, as Renfe favoured the entirely domestic Talgo Pendular, a tilting train with passive suspension introduced in 1980. After revenue service in 1979–1982, the train was used for charter and test runs.

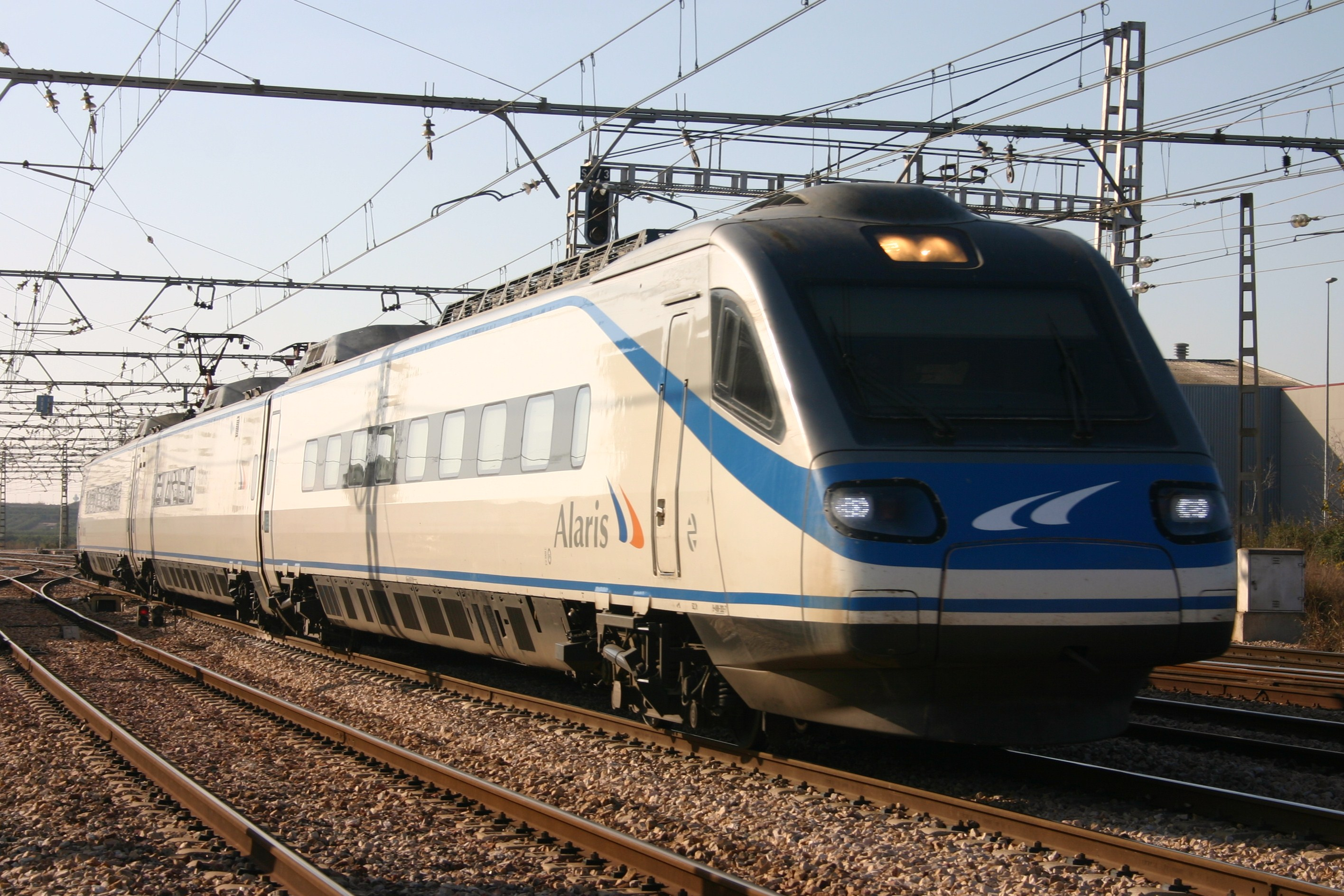
An Alaris train set from Atocha station in Madrid for Silla (Valencia)

Two decades later, to speed up services along its Madrid-Valencia conventional line, Renfe ordered ten Pendolini in 1996. The trains, based on the ETR 460 and ETR 470, were delivered by a joint consortium of Fiat Ferroviaria and GEC-Alsthom from 1998 as Renfe Class 490. The three-car trains are suited for 220 km/h (140 mph) on Renfe's conventional lines electrified with 3 kV DC. The Class 490 took up the new Madrid-Valencia Alaris services in 1999. With growing demand, the capacity of the Class 490 was no longer sufficient, and from February 2008, the trains were transferred to the Corredor Mediterráneo line between Valencia and Barcelona.

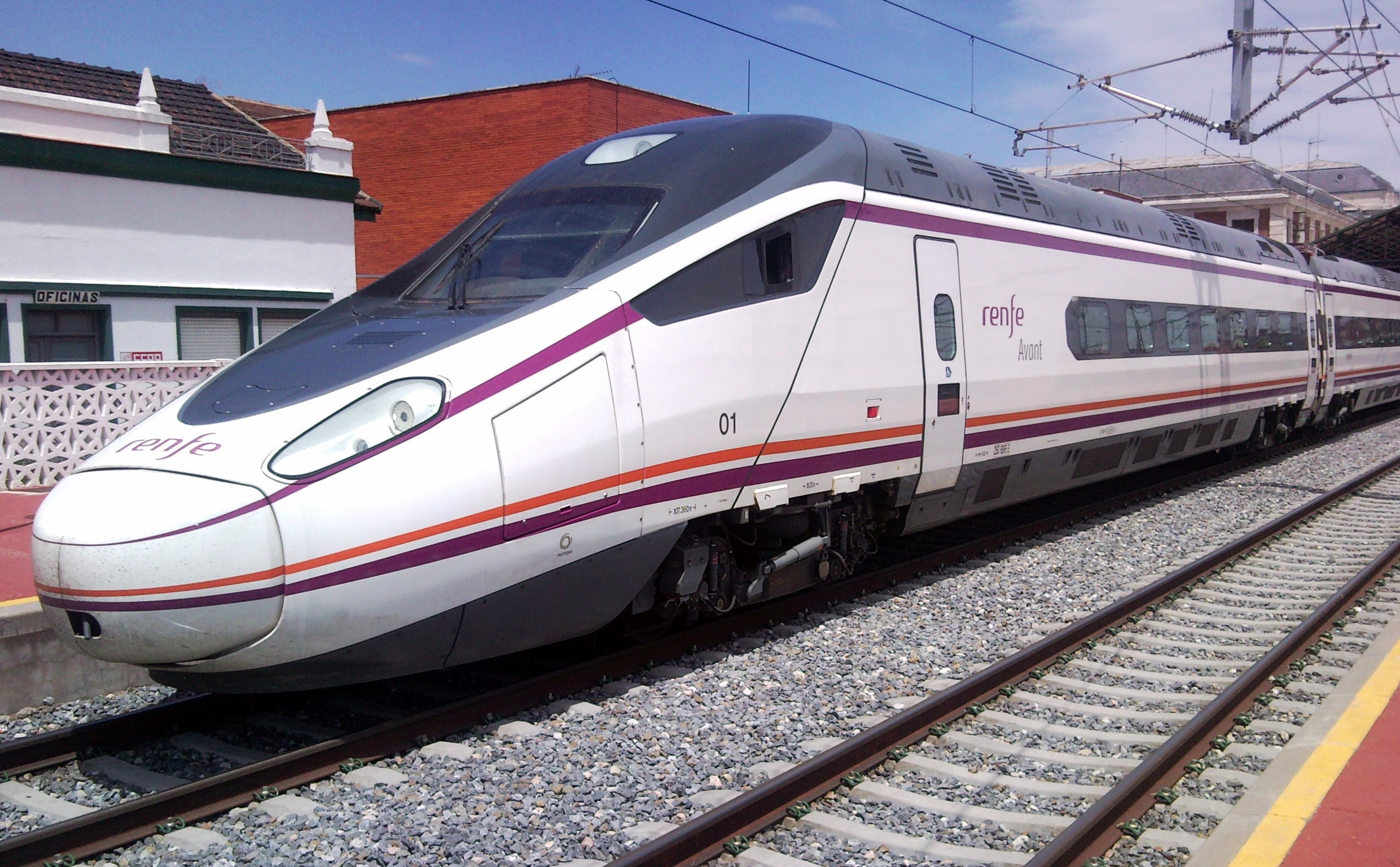
An Avant S-114 train set in Valladolid-Campo Grande station

For medium-distance services along its high-speed lines, Renfe ordered a non-tilting variant of the Pendolino, based on the ETR 480, in 2001. The 20 four-car trains with a service top speed of 250 km/h (160 mph) were built jointly by Alstom and CAF and delivered as the Renfe Class 104. Renfe deployed them for the new Avant services along the Madrid–Seville high-speed rail line, starting 29 December 2004.

Renfe ordered another 30 non-tilting medium-distance high-speed trains from Alstom/CAF in a follow-on order, which was later reduced to 13 units. However, these trains are based on the New Pendolino design. The first train of the new class designated Renfe Class 114 was presented in autumn 2008. Most of them are used in services along the Madrid–Valladolid high-speed line.

=== Germany ===
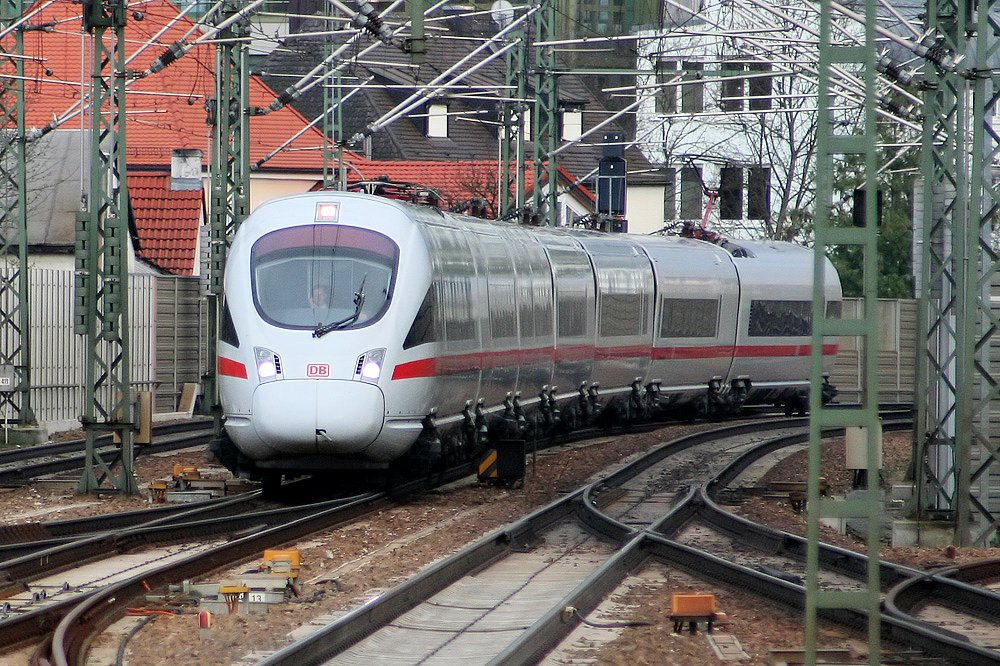
ICE T in curve

The West German federal railways DB experimented with tilting technology in the 1970s, but abandoned it. Then in 1987, DB commissioned a study on whether electrification or purchasing diesel tilting trains would be the better option for the Nuremberg-Hof line, and decided for the latter. In 1988, DB ordered ten tilting DMUs, and another ten in 1990. All 20 trains of the new DB Class 610 were delivered in 1992. The two-car trains with a top speed of 160 km/h (99 mph) were produced by a consortium of five German companies and Fiat Ferroviaria. Fiat supplied the bogies, the hydraulic tilting suspension, and the other parts of the tilting technology, thus the trains could be called Pendolino (a Fiat trademarked brand name).

Deutsche Bahn ordered more regional and express tilting DMUs with other technology (class 611 and class 612: Adtranz/Bombardier, ICE TD/class 605: Siemens). However, for the 230 km/h (140 mph) electric ICE T trains ordered in 1994 for service on conventional lines, Pendolino technology was chosen again. Fiat (Alstom) supplied the bogies and tilting technology for the 32 seven-car class 411 and 11 five-car class 415 express trains that entered service from 1999. In 2002, DB placed another order for slightly modified class 411 trains, Alstom Ferroviaria was again supplier of bogies and tilt technology when the 28 trains were delivered from 2004 to 2006.

=== Switzerland ===
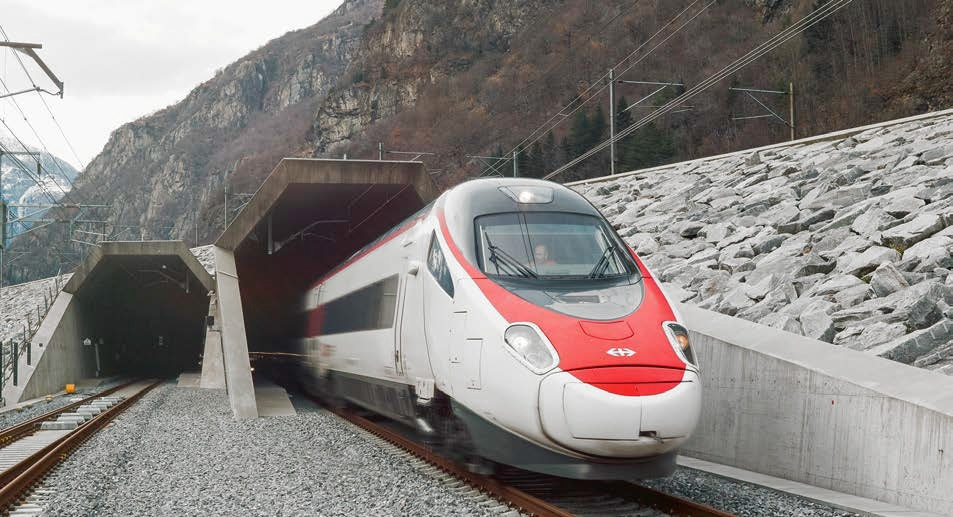
SBB ETR 610 at the Gotthard Base Tunnel

Since the failure of Cisalpino, a joint venture between the Italian Trenitalia and the Swiss Federal Railways (SBB), the Pendolinos used for transalpine transport between Switzerland and Italy, on the Gotthard and Lötschberg axis routes, were split between Trenitalia (five ETR 470 and seven ETR 610) and SBB (four ETR 470 and seven ETR 610). The low reliability of the timetable and of the ETR 470 has led SBB and Trenitalia to always have a reserve train ready at each terminus of the Milan-Zürich route.

In 2012, SBB ordered eight new ETR 610 with delivery in 2015 to be operated on the Milan - Geneva and Milan - Zürich routes.

=== Finland ===
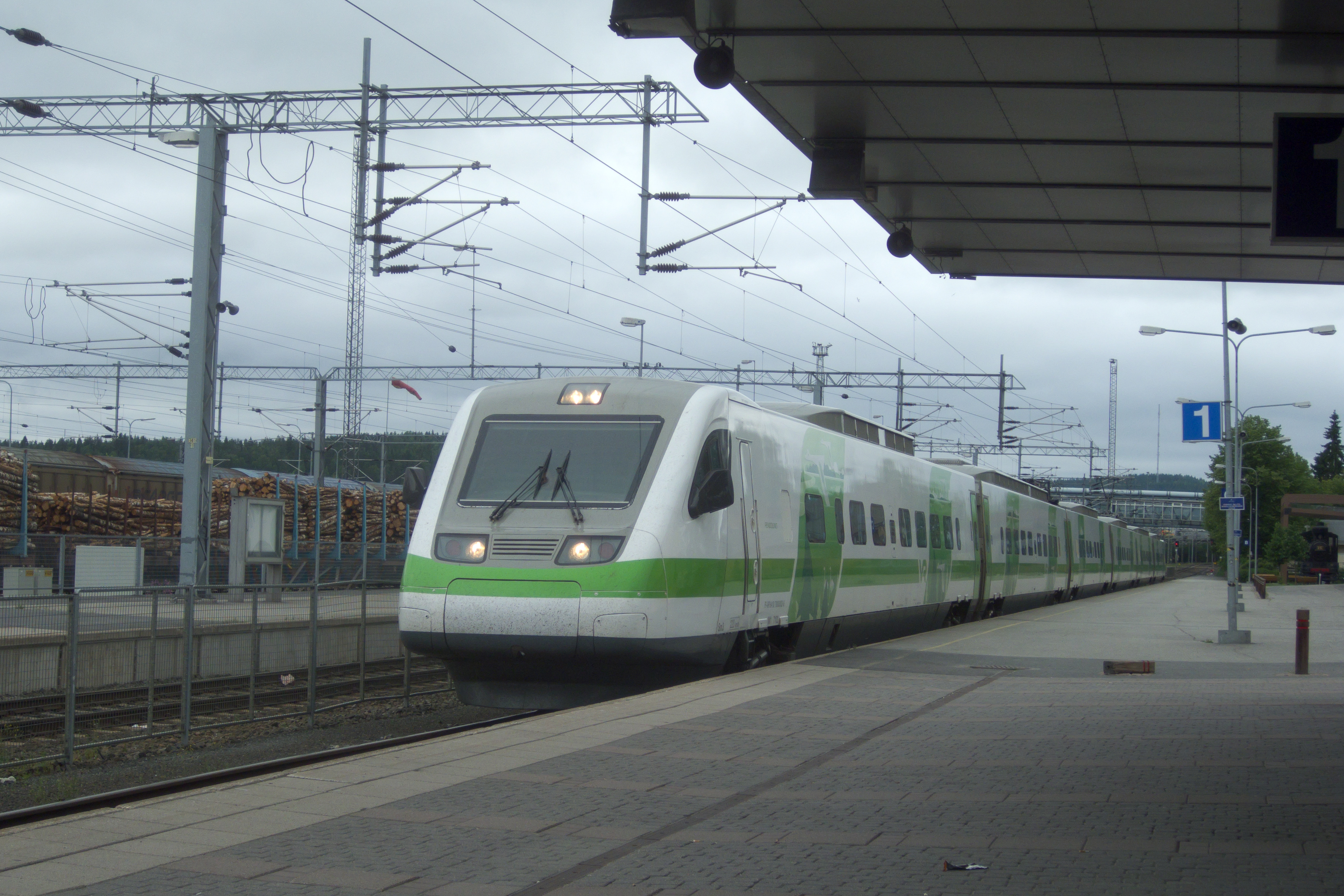
An Sm3 class Pendolino arrives at Jyväskylä railway station

The Finnish model, the class Sm3, is based on the ETR 460 but was adapted to the specific requirements of VR Group (formerly the Finnish State Railways) and to the cold climatic conditions. The first two units were assembled in 1995 by Rautaruukki-Transtech. A total of sixteen additional units were purchased from Alstom and shipped to Finland between 2000 and 2006. Sm3 trains operate from Helsinki to the cities of Turku, Tampere, Jyväskylä, Oulu, Kouvola, Joensuu and Vaasa.

The trains are composed of six carriages. Four cars are fitted with two asynchronous three-phase AC motors (one for each bogie); two are unpowered but are fitted with pantographs. One of these coaches is a restaurant carriage. The motors deliver a continuous power of 4,000 kW (5,400 hp) and propel the train at a maximum speed of 220 km/h (140 mph).

The Sm3 has received a lot of bad publicity in Finland for its reliability issues, mostly caused by technical problems in cold weather with the tilting system and couplers. VR has tried to mitigate the problem by coupling trains only at termini instead of intermediate stations and switching the tilting system off during winter. The trains were expected to receive significant maintenance between 2012 and 2014, to improve reliability of couplers and the tilting system.

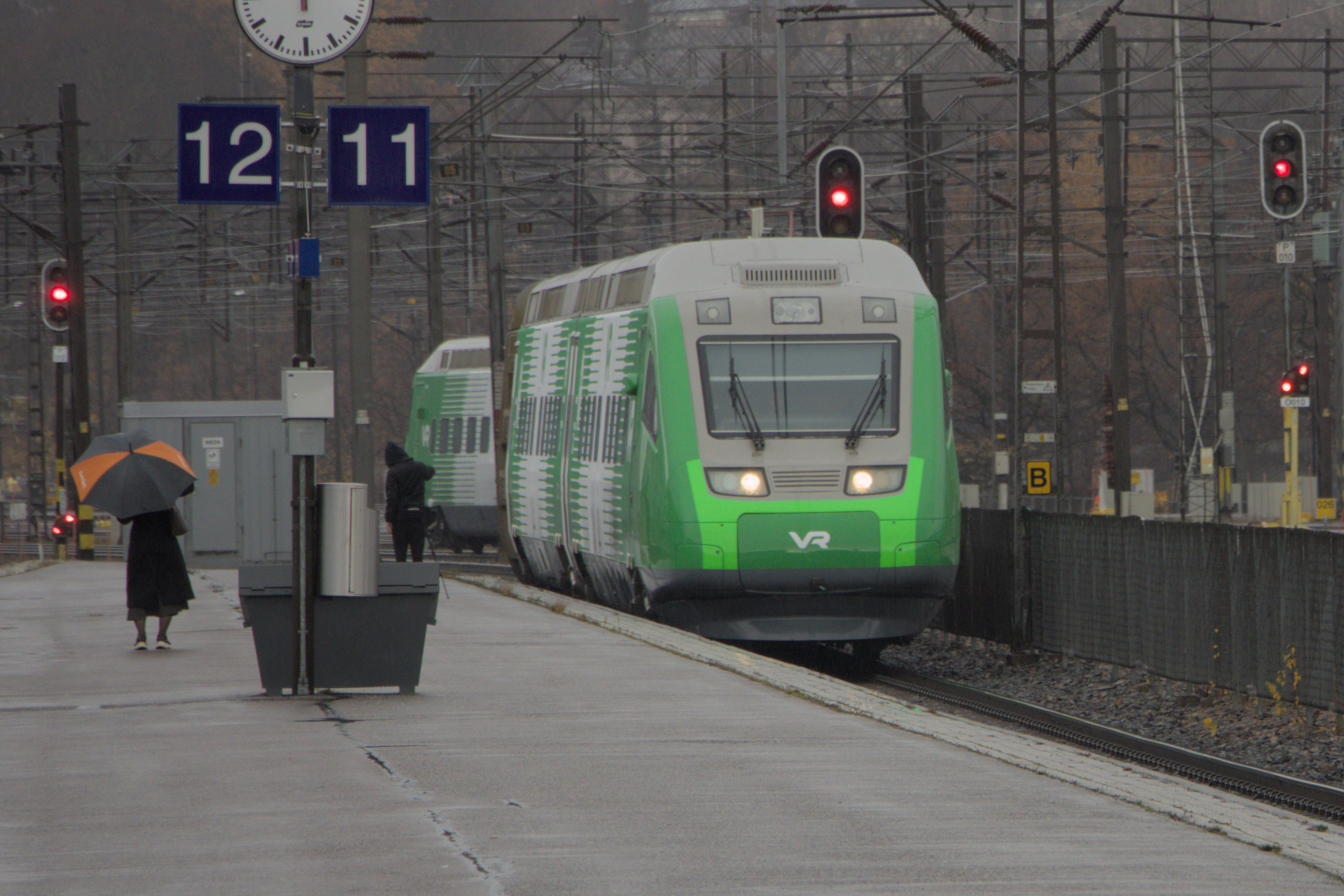
VR Class Sm6 train arriving at Helsinki Central

Karelian Trains, a 50-50 joint venture between VR and the Russian Railways, operated four 1522 mm gauge class Sm6 seven-car Pendolinos for use on 220 km/h (140 mph) Allegro (Russian: Аллегро) Saint Petersburg–Helsinki services. Service started on December 12, 2010, reducing travel time between the cities from five and a half hours to three and a half hours at first and later to three hours. The bogies were specially constructed to allow for 220 km/h (140 mph) speed both at the Finnish gauge 1,524 mm (5 ft) and the Russian gauge 1,520 mm (4 ft 11 27/32 in).

Allegro services were suspended on March 27, 2022, as per VR's announcement that operating a connection between Russia and Finland no longer served a purpose due to the Russian invasion of Ukraine. VR subsequently took control of the trainsets, and they entered domestic service in Finland in November 2025.

=== Portugal ===
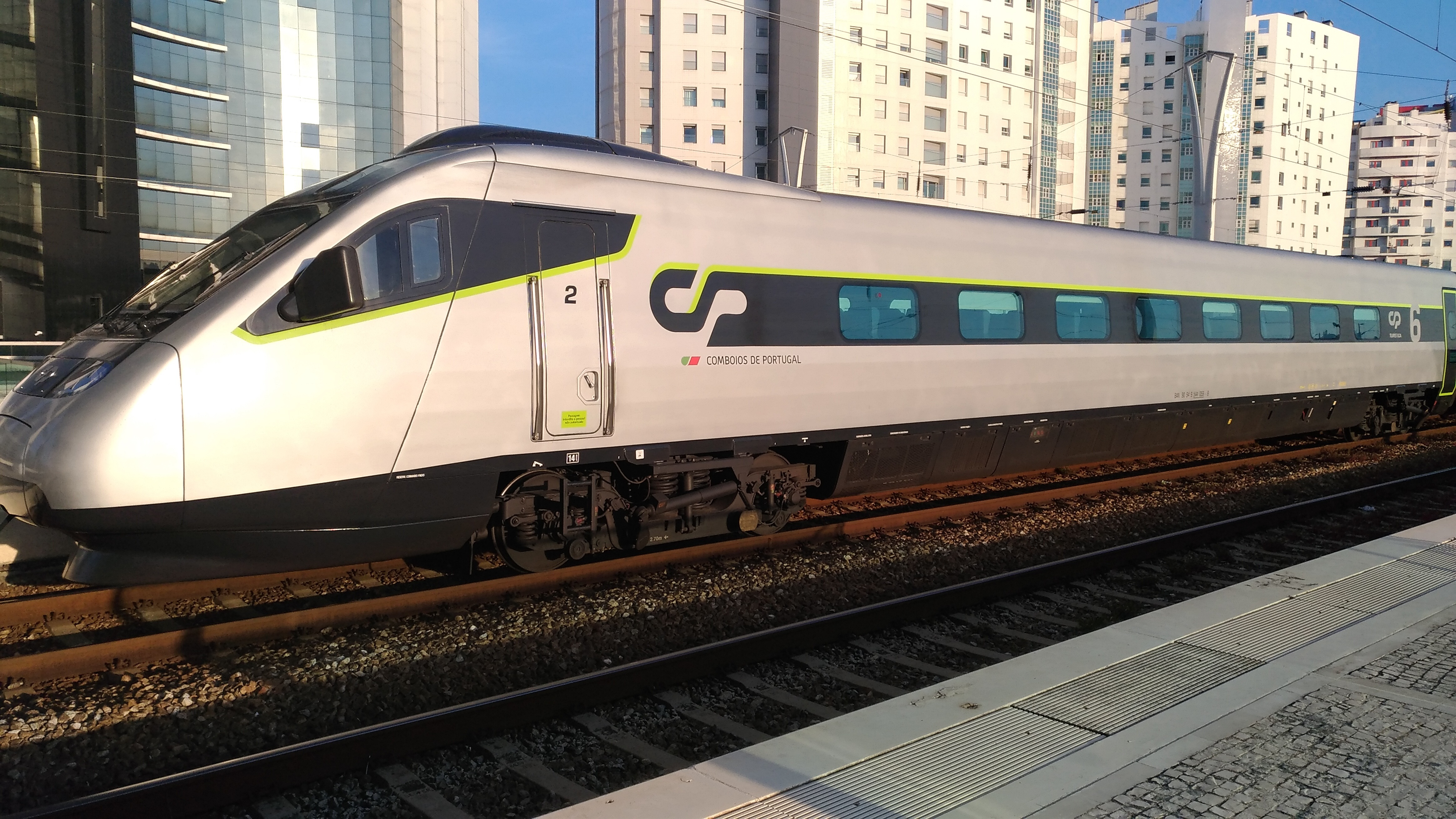
Alfa Pendular in Lisbon

In Portugal the Pendolino is named Alfa Pendular and is operated by the Portuguese state railway company CP. It connects the cities of Guimarães, Braga, Porto, Aveiro, Coimbra, Santarém, Lisbon, Albufeira and Faro, among others, and has a top speed of 220 km/h (140 mph). The bogies had to be redesigned for operation on Portugal's broad gauge track, and the trains were assembled by Adtranz Portugal at the Amadora plant (former Sorefame). Main contractor was Fiat Ferroviaria later acquired by Alstom with two main subcontractors Adtranz and Siemens that was responsible for the traction and train control.

Ten six-car train sets were produced between 1998 and 2001, with commercial operation from early 1999. Based on the ETR 460 the Portuguese Pendolino differs mainly from its predecessor from the carbody width that takes advantage of the Iberian gauge 1,668 mm (5 ft 5 21/32 in).

=== Slovenia ===
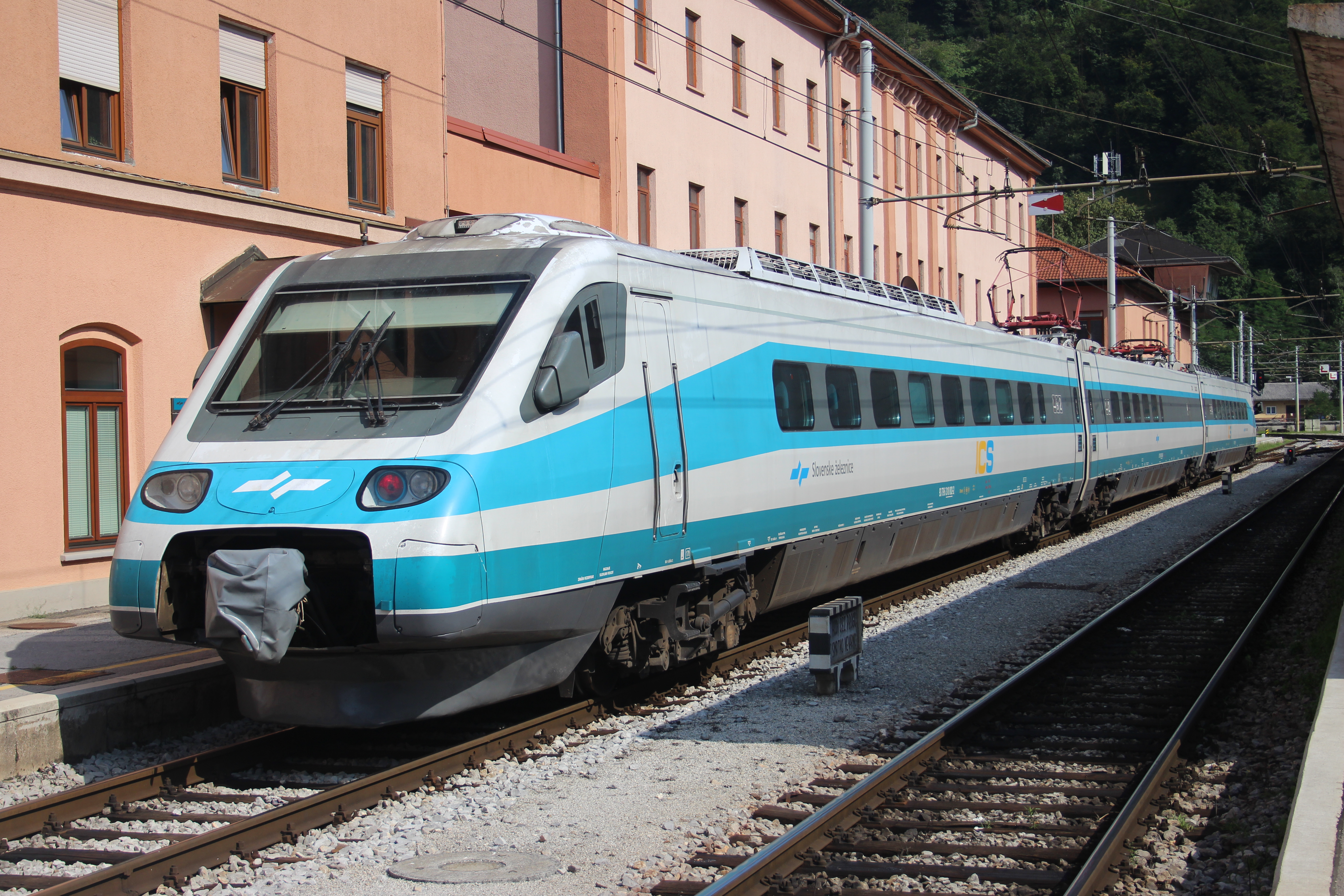
SŽ 310 operated by Slovenske Železnice at Zidani Most

Slovenian Railways ordered three Pendolino tilting trains for its main lines. The three-car trains, delivered as SŽ series 310, were derived from the ETR 460. The series 310 can reach a maximum speed of 200 km/h (120 mph), but in revenue service on the Slovenian railway network, the maximum it reaches is 160 km/h (99 mph) between Maribor and Pragersko stations, as well as between Grobelno and Celje stations.

Since 24 September 2000, the series 310 runs the InterCitySlovenija (ICS) service, linking the major cities of Slovenia in one line: Ljubljana, Zidani Most, Celje and Maribor, with a frequent service that acts as a high-speed shuttle. Until April 2008, once per day the route from Maribor to Ljubljana was extended as international train to Venice via Monfalcone serving Trieste.

Train offers 1st and 2nd class and on-board bar. 1st Class offers leather seats in 1-2 configuration, 220 V Power Outlet (all seats), Wi-Fi, electric blind, recline, every seat has a table which can be extended to (100 cm x 80 cm) for business meetings or eating, air conditioning outlet, reading light and wider seats (20 cm). 2nd Class offers plush seats in 2-2 configuration, 220 V power outlet (Some seats), Wi-Fi, electric blinds, foot rest (most seats), most have a tray table and some have a conference table which can extend to (100 cm x 80 cm) for working or eating, air conditioning outlet and a reading light.

=== United Kingdom ===
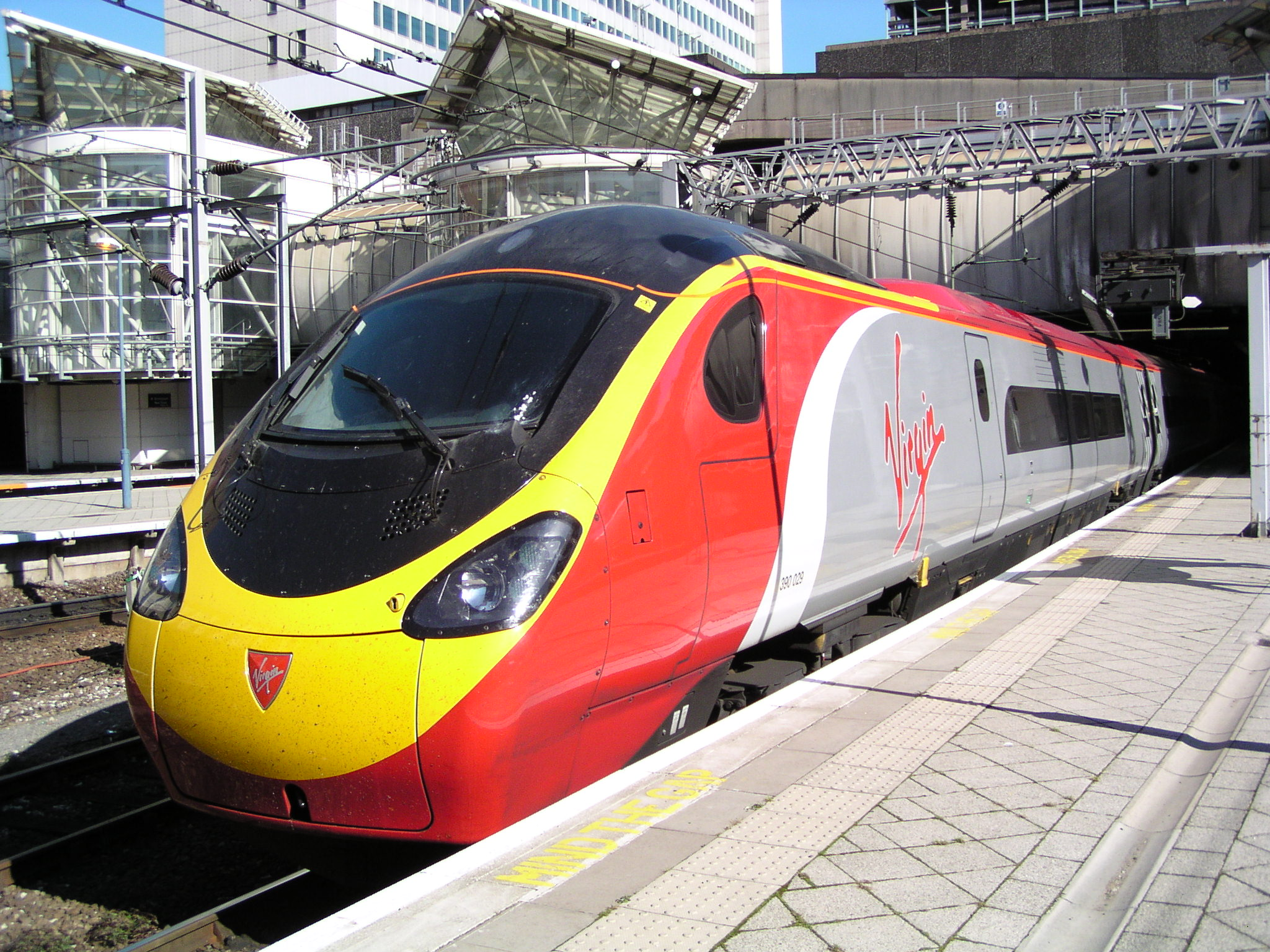
Class 390 Alstom Pendolino at Birmingham New Street

In 1999, 53 Class 390 Pendolinos were ordered by Virgin Trains West Coast to operate services on the West Coast Main Line in the United Kingdom. All were built by Alstom with the body shells built at its Savigliano factory in Italy and fitted out at its former Metro-Cammell factory in Washwood Heath in Birmingham, England.

Owing to cutbacks by Railtrack to the West Coast Main Line upgrade to provide in-cab signalling, these are limited in service to 125 mph or 201 km/h operation rather than their 140 mph or 230 km/h design speed.

In 2008, the Department for Transport announced that 31 of the existing nine-car sets would be lengthened to 11 cars to increase capacity. Four new 11-car sets were also to be built. The longer units required major infrastructure changes to allow stations and depots to accommodate the 11-car units. With the closure of the Washwood Heath works, the additional vehicles were manufactured at Savigliano. The first new sets were built with 11 cars and delivered in December 2010. The lengthening project was completed in December 2012.

In the early 1980s, British Rail had planned to bring tilting train technology to the same line with the Class 370 Advanced Passenger Train project. Technical problems caused by pressure to launch the service early and lack of the political will to provide sufficient funding to overcome them forced the abandonment of this early attempt, although much of the technology was used to design and build Pendolino trains.

On 23 February 2007, a Virgin Trains Pendolino train derailed in the Grayrigg rail crash, Virgin chairman Richard Branson credited the robust construction of the Pendolino with saving lives in the crash. Although only some carriages were damaged, the damage was beyond economical repair and the set was written off.

All remaining 56 sets passed to Avanti West Coast with the West Coast Partnership franchise in December 2019.

=== Czech Republic ===
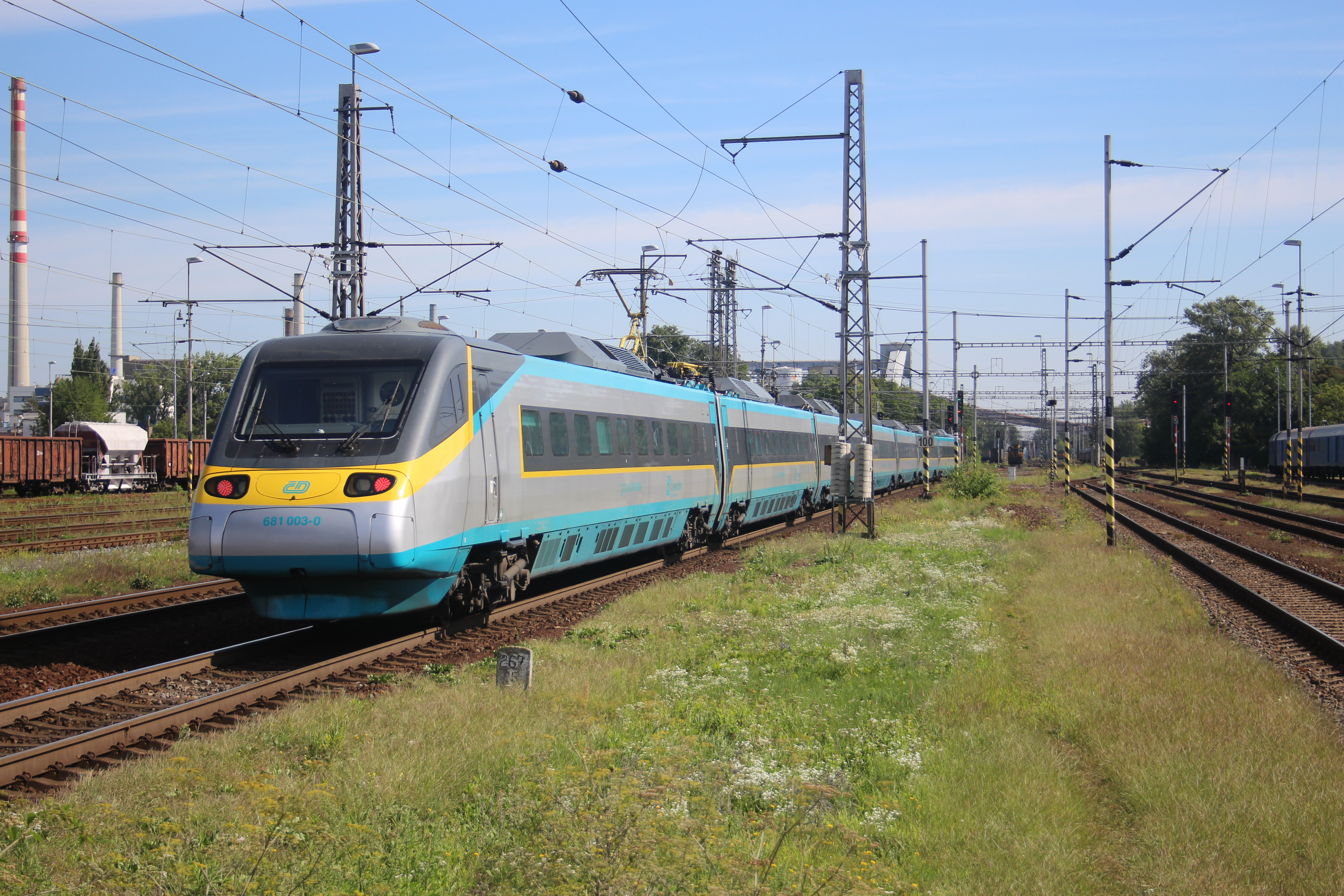
ČD class 680 Pendolino departing Ostrava main railway station, on a service to Košice, Slovakia

In 1995 consortium consisting of ČKD, MSV Studénka, FIAT Ferroviaria and Siemens won tender for the construction of ten tilting trains for the Czech Railways ČD, intended for international service Berlin - Prague - Vienna. After ČKD bankruptcy in 2000, Alstom (as the new owner of FIAT Ferroviaria) took over whole order, reducing number of sets to seven and raising total price, while provided an improved version of ETR 470, equipped to work on 25 kV 50 Hz AC, 15 kV 16.7 Hz AC and 3,000 V DC, thus suitable to operate in Germany, Austria, Slovakia and the Czech Republic. The first set was delivered in 2004 as Pendolino ČD 680. While testing between Brno and Břeclav on 18 November 2004, the Pendolino reached a speed of 237 km/h (147 mph) and created a new Czech railway speed record.

During the testing period, the train had problems with the Czech signalling system. The problems were said to be solved and the trains entered regular service in December 2005 between Prague and Ostrava. As of late January 2006, all five Czech Pendolino trains in service suffered from software and functional problems, which were later fixed, but the trains still did not receive permission to operate abroad. In December 2006, the trains were given permission to operate in Slovakia and Austria, but as of 2010 permission for Germany has not yet been granted.

A Czech Pendolino train appeared in the 2006 James Bond film Casino Royale and in Timur Bekmambetov's 2008 film Wanted starring Angelina Jolie.

=== Slovakia ===
Czech Railways ČD has been operating Pendolino as an international train between the Czech Republic and Slovakia for many years. At first it started operating trains from Prague to Bratislava in December 2005 and later also trains from Prague to Košice in December 2014. The connection to Bratislava ended in 2015.

=== Poland ===
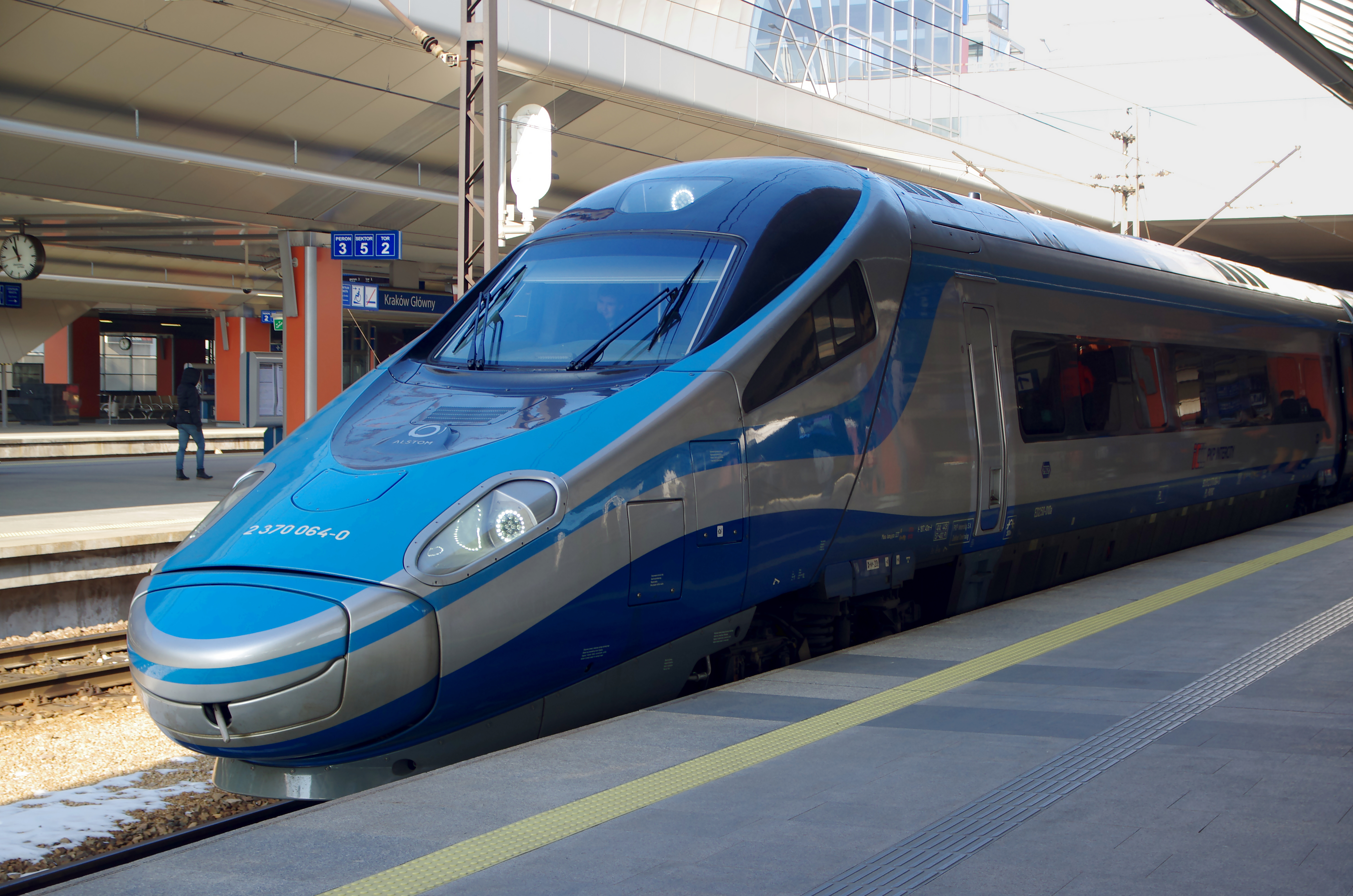
A PKP Intercity ED250 in Kraków Główny railway station, Poland

Polish state railways PKP ordered 14 Pendolinos in 1998, but the order was cancelled in 2000 due to a shortage of funds.

In 2010, Alstom won a PKP Intercity tender for high-speed trains with an offer of 20 New Pendolino trains. Similarly to the CRH5, these are non-tilting. Like the ČD class 680, the Pendolinos are equipped to operate on 15 kV 16·7 Hz and 25 kV 50 Hz as well as 3 kV DC for operation in Poland, and have the train control systems needed to operate in Germany, Austria and the Czech Republic. However, certification for international operation is not seen as a priority, as the trains are restricted to domestic services for an initial ten years under the terms of a grant from the EU Cohesion Fund which covered 22% of the project cost.

On 30 May 2011 the Polish state railways PKP signed an agreement with Alstom for 20 Pendolinos ETR 610 for delivery in 2014. The first Pendolino was delivered on 12 August 2013. Each seven-car Class ED250 trainset has seats for 57 first class and 345 second class passengers, with a buffet/bar and three four-seat business or family compartments. The Pendolinos were to operate on the high-speed 'CMK' Central Rail Line from Kraków/Katowice to Warsaw, and on the routes from Gdynia to Warsaw and from Wrocław to Warsaw.

High speed tests using the new Pendolino ED250 on the CMK began in November 2013. On the first day of tests, 16 November, the Pendolino reached 242 km/h (150 mph). On 17 November 2013, a new speed record for Polish railways was set at km 184.000 of the CMK when Pendolino ED250 reached a speed of 291 km/h (181 mph), breaking the 19-year record of 250.1 km/h (155 mph). On 24 November 2013, the final day of tests on the CMK the Pendolino reached 293 km/h (182 mph).

The contract between the Polish operator PKP Intercity and Alstom called for the first eight Pendolino ED250 trainsets to be delivered on 6 May 2014, tested ('homologated') for operation at 250 km/h (155 mph) using ETCS L2 signalling. The tests had not been performed by May, and PKP announced that Alstom had failed to meet the contract terms and would be charged penalties as of 6 May. Alstom responded that homologation in Poland at 250km/h using ETCS L2 was impossible, since ETCS L2 was not operational anywhere in Poland, and the CMK where the first ED250 Pendolino had reached 293 km/h (182 mph) in testing was equipped with ETCS Level 1, not Level 2. On 26 June 2014, a compromise was reached between PKP and Alstom under which the Pendolinos would be delivered under a two-stage homologation, first homologated for operation using ETCS Level 1 and eventually to be homologated for ETCS Level 2. The Pendolinos were put in service on 14 December 2014.

In addition to the CMK from Warsaw to Kraków and Katowice, and from Warsaw to Wrocław, the Pendolinos also operate on the 350 km (220 miles) route from Warsaw to Gdańsk and Gdynia on the Baltic Sea. In 2011-2015 the Warsaw-Gdańsk-Gdynia route underwent a major upgrading costing $3 billion, partly funded by the European Investment Bank, including track replacement, realignment of curves and relocation of sections of track to allow speeds up to 200 km/h (124 mph), and modernization of stations. Installation of ETCS L2 was under way in 2016. When Pendolino services started on 14 December 2014 the previous Warsaw–Gdańsk rail travel time of 4-1/2 to 6 hours was reduced to 2 hours 58 minutes by Pendolino, and reduced further to 2 hours 39 minutes in December 2015.

Introduction of the fast, modern Pendolinos in December 2014, had a major effect on rail ridership in Poland. In the first five months of 2015, Warsaw–Kraków rail ridership rose by 50 percent. In May 2015 alone, Warsaw–Kraków ridership was 70 percent higher than a year earlier.

After the initial delays Polish Pendolinos were upgraded to provide the access to wireless internet. As of September 2021, all 19 trainsets actually operating have got the equipment installed.

=== China ===
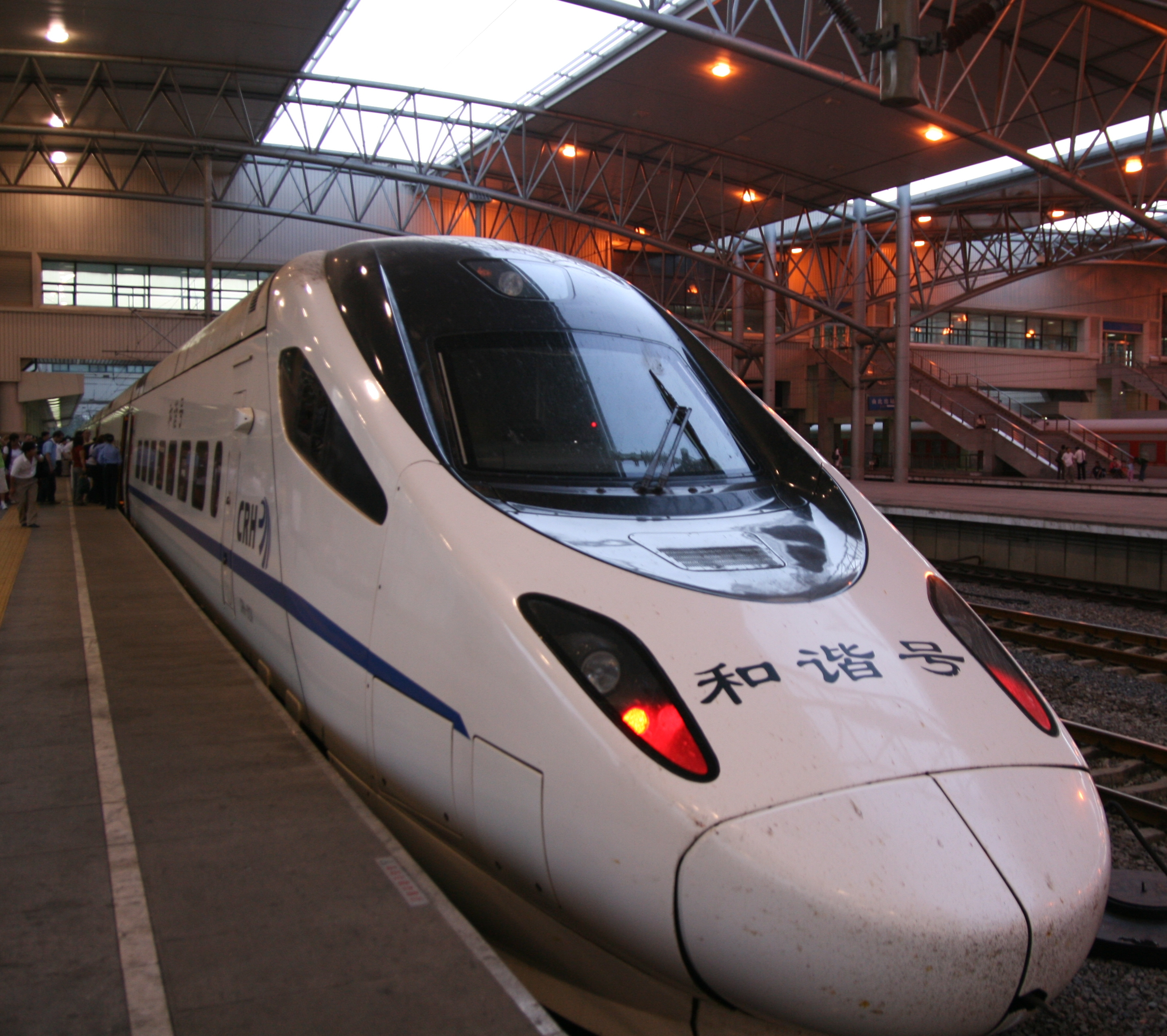
CRH5 in Shenyang, Liaoning, China

China Railway High-speed (CRH) purchased technologies from Alstom to assemble 60 sets of high speed EMU trains, which have been named CRH5 and are based on the New Pendolino trains. The CRH5 are non-tilting trains. Thirty additional sets were ordered in 2009 and 20 additional sets was ordered in 2010 to complete the current fleet operating on China's northern and eastern lines.

=== United States ===
In August 2016, Amtrak and Alstom unveiled the new Avelia Liberty that will take passengers between Washington, D.C., and Boston as part of a Northeast Corridor rehabilitation project starting in 2021, replacing the aged Acela Express. The train has safety features that comply with Federal Railroad Administration standards, along with greater comfort, more capacity, built in Wi-Fi, Tiltronix, and with speeds up to 180 mph or 290 km/h.

=== Greece ===
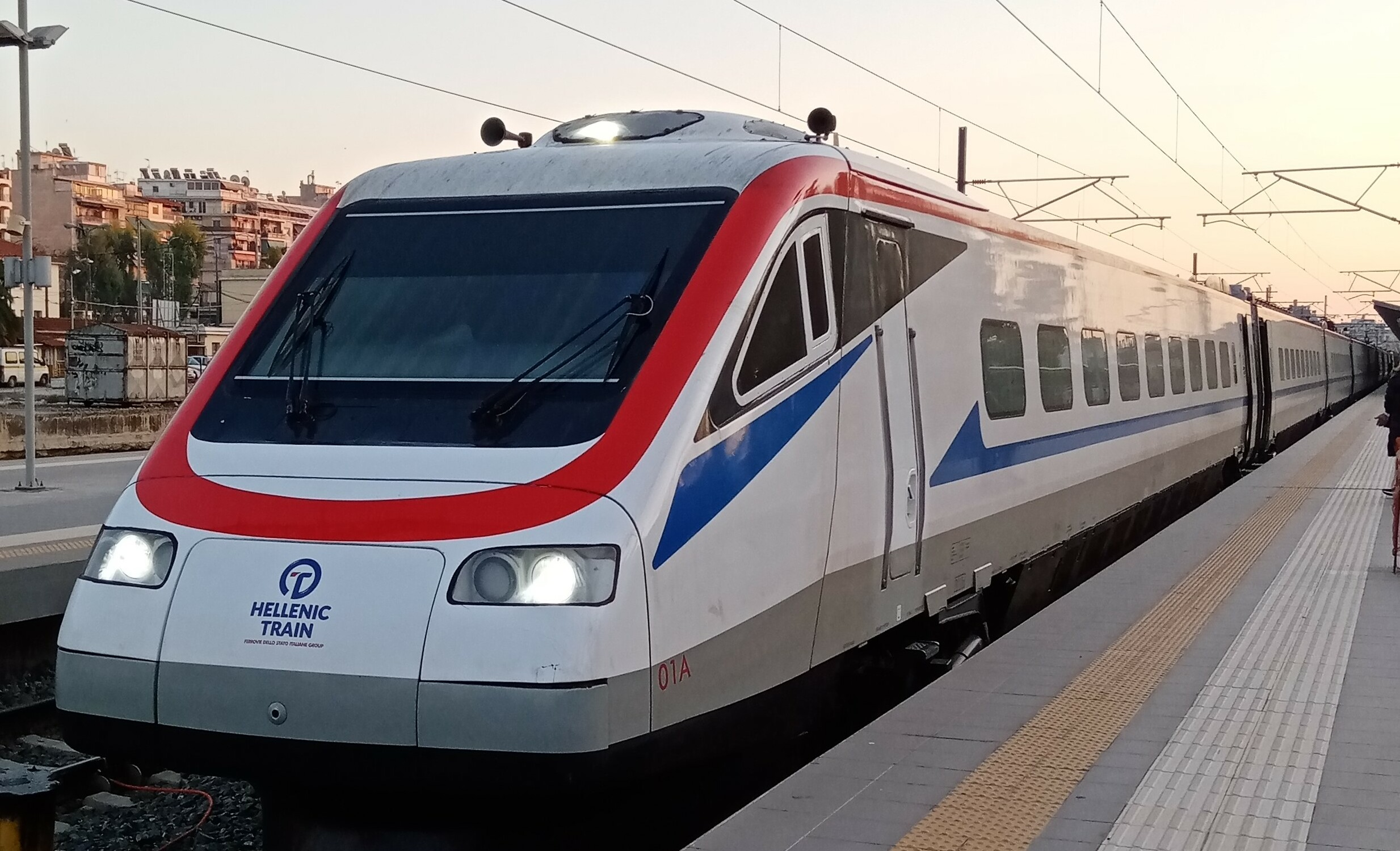
ETR 470 in Athens Central station, Athens, Greece

In 2019, Greek railway operator company TrainOSE, a subsidiary of Italian company Ferrovie dello Stato Italiane, purchased 5 ETR 470 high-speed trains, previously used on Frecciabianca railway services in Italy, to be deployed on the Athens-Thessaloniki high-speed railway. The trains originally had 3 kV DC equipment, which was replaced by 25 kV 50 Hz equipment, to match Greek railway standards and were fitted with ETCS onboard equipment. The first unit arrived in Greece in January 2021. Express passenger services started in early 2022 on the Athens-Thessaloniki mainline.

== Cancelled orders ==
In 1998, CFR of Romania announced its intent to order two Pendolinos by the end of the year, and wanted to sign another agreement about the local production of 19 more units under a license agreement the next year. However, these plans were not followed up.

In 2002, ZSSK of Slovakia considered purchasing four Pendolinos, in close cooperation with ČD of the Czech Republic. The trains were to run as ZSSK class 650. This project was given up in 2004 for lack of funds.

The Ukrainian Railways announced its intent to buy seven Pendolinos for the UEFA Euro 2012 in 2008, but failed to secure the financing later on. Consequentially, in 2011, ten South Korean-built HRCS2 trains were later purchased by Ukraine.

== See also ==
- British Rail's Advanced Passenger Train
- China Railways CRH5
- ElettroTreno
- Train categories in Europe
- Minimum railway curve radius
