= Railroad Wash =

Railroad Wash may mean:

- Railroad Wash (Gila River tributary), in Greenlee County, Arizona and Hidalgo County, New Mexico
- Railroad Wash (Gold Gulch tributary), in Cochise County, Arizona
