= Wild Card Games =

- Industry: Card games, board games
- Founded: 2005
- Headquarters: United Kingdom
- Website: wildcardgames.com

Wild Card Games is a company which designs board games and card games.

== History ==
The company was started in 2005 by Sean Byrne and his wife. Its first game was called Backpacker. In December 2013, the company released Who Knows Where?, a double-sided board game. In 2019, the company created a customized edition of Mapominoes for distribution to Interrail pass holders.

== Mapominoes ==
Mapominoes is a card game where each card represents an individual country, and players take turns placing a country-card on the table, adjacent to a bordering country. It has been described as "like dominoes, but with maps". Editions include Europe, Asia, Africa, and the Americas.
