= Renfe Class 490 =

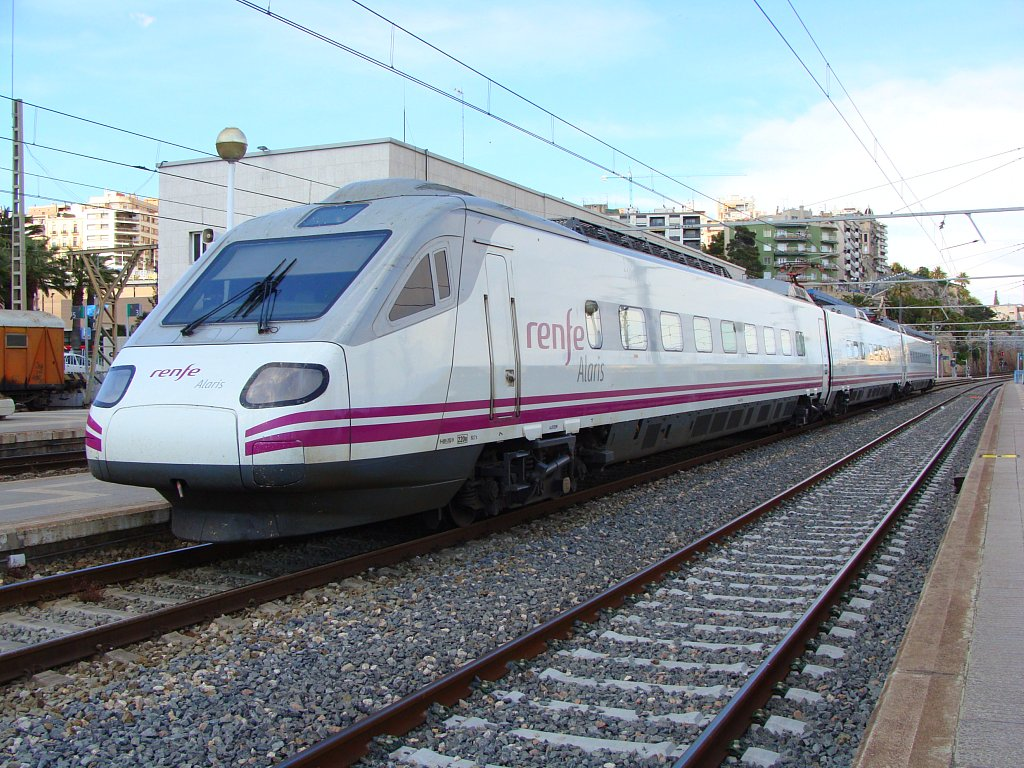
- Renfe Class 490 Alaris at Tarragona.
- In service: 1999-2014; 2022-present (six units)
- Manufacturer: Alstom and Fiat Ferroviaria
- Constructed: 1998–99
- Refurbished: 2006–07
- Number built: 10
- Capacity: 160
- Operators: Renfe
- Lines served: Madrid–Valencia (among others)

Specifications
- Train length: 79.40 m (260 ft 6 in)
- Width: 2.92 m (9 ft 7 in)
- Height: 3.853 m (12 ft 7.7 in)
- Maximum speed: 220 km/h (140 mph); 160 km/h (99 mph) (since 2022)
- Weight: 159 t (156 long tons; 175 short tons)
- Traction system: 4 asynchronous three-phase electric motors
- Power output: 2,040 kW (2,740 hp)
- Electric system(s): 3 kV DC Catenary
- Current collector(s): Pantograph
- UIC classification: 1AoAo1+2'2'+1AoAo1
- Track gauge: 1,668 mm (5 ft 5 21/32 in) Iberian gauge

The Renfe Class 490, also known as the ETR 490, is an electric multiple unit constructed by Alstom and Fiat Ferroviaria and operated by Spanish rail company Renfe on its Alaris long-distance services. Since the introduction of the Alaris service, only ETR 490 units have been used for this service. Therefore, these trainsets are often known as Alaris themselves. The units were the first actively tilting units to go into regular service in Spain.

Unlike most other members of the Pendolino rail family, the ETR 490 trainset is composed of only three cars: two motors vehicles, with driving cabs, and a trailer car in the centre. (This arrangement is shared with the SŽ series 310 in Slovenia, which are fundamentally the same train as the class 490, but built to standard gauge) in Its motor system is similar to that of an electric multiple unit because its pantograph is not located on a locomotive. The motor cars on either end of the train contain a pair of motor bogies, with one asynchronous motors per bogie. Static and other converters are also located underneath the motor cars.

The central passenger car is divided into two spaces: half is passenger seating while the other part is a bar and restaurant. A section of this car is also dedicated to people with mobility and accessibility impairments. The dimensions of the ETR 490 are reduced compared to its Italian model. These dimensions favour aerodynamic stability and speed. The cars are also built out of lighter materials that allow the train to move faster and put less stress on the tracks. The power consumption of the Alaris trainset is considerably less than the Italian ETR 460, almost reduced by one third.

The tilting mechanism of the ETR 490 is quite similar to that of the second and third generation Pendolino series, controlled by gyroscopes, devices measuring oscillation, and speedometers. The tilt is limited to eight degrees when fully activated when compared to a horizontal surface. Disk brakes control pneumatic and rheostatic braking.
