= Interrail =

International rail pass for travel in European countries

Logo of Interrail B.V.

The Interrail Pass is a rail pass allowing unlimited travel across participating railway routes in 33 European countries, on a certain number of 'travel days' over a period. Additional reservations may be required for some services.

The Eurail Pass was a similar rail pass, which became available first and was sold to non-European residents and citizens (whilst Interrail was for European residents). It gradually became more similar to the Interrail pass. The Eurail branding and passes were merged into Interrail in September 2026.

== Coverage ==
Countries in which the Interrail Global Pass is valid

Interrail has participating operators in the following European countries/regions:

- Austria, including Liechtenstein (Note: The railways of Liechtenstein are operated by Austria's ÖBB)
- Belgium
- Bosnia and Herzegovina
- Bulgaria
- Croatia
- Czech Republic
- Denmark
- Estonia
- Finland
- France (excluding Corsica), including Monaco (Note: The railways of Monaco are operated by France's SNCF)
- Germany
- (United Kingdom) Great Britain (England, Scotland, Wales)
- Greece
- Hungary
- (Republic of Ireland) Ireland, including (United Kingdom) Northern Ireland
- Italy
- Latvia
- Lithuania
- Luxembourg
- Montenegro
- The Netherlands
- North Macedonia
- Norway
- Poland
- Portugal
- Romania
- Serbia
- Slovakia
- Slovenia
- Spain
- Switzerland
- Sweden
- Turkey

Interrail passes are not valid on railways in Albania, Kosovo and the countries of Belarus, Moldova, Russia, and Ukraine. There are no railways in Andorra, Cyprus, the Faroe Islands, Gibraltar, Iceland, Malta, or San Marino. Andorre-L'Hospitalet station in France is the closest railway station for Andorra. Rimini station in Italy, is the closest station for San Marino.

The national railway operator for each country is always included, but any other private operators in each country may not be.

Some private operators, particularly scenic tourist railways such as Jungfraubahn, may give pass holders the benefit of a discounted fare, even if they do not accept Interrail as a ticket. There are also other benefits available to pass holders, such as discounts outside of rail travel.

Some types of pass include participating ferry routes (such as between Greece and Italy), and/or discounts on other select ferry routes (such as between Finland and Estonia).

== Age categories ==
Passes are sold in three discounted age categories and the full adult fare:

- Child Pass: free pass for travellers between 4-12 years old, accompanied by anyone with a valid pass over the age of 18 (children under 4 do not require a pass).
- Youth Pass: for travellers under the age of 27
- Senior Pass: for travellers over the age of 60
- Adult Pass

== Types ==
=== Format ===
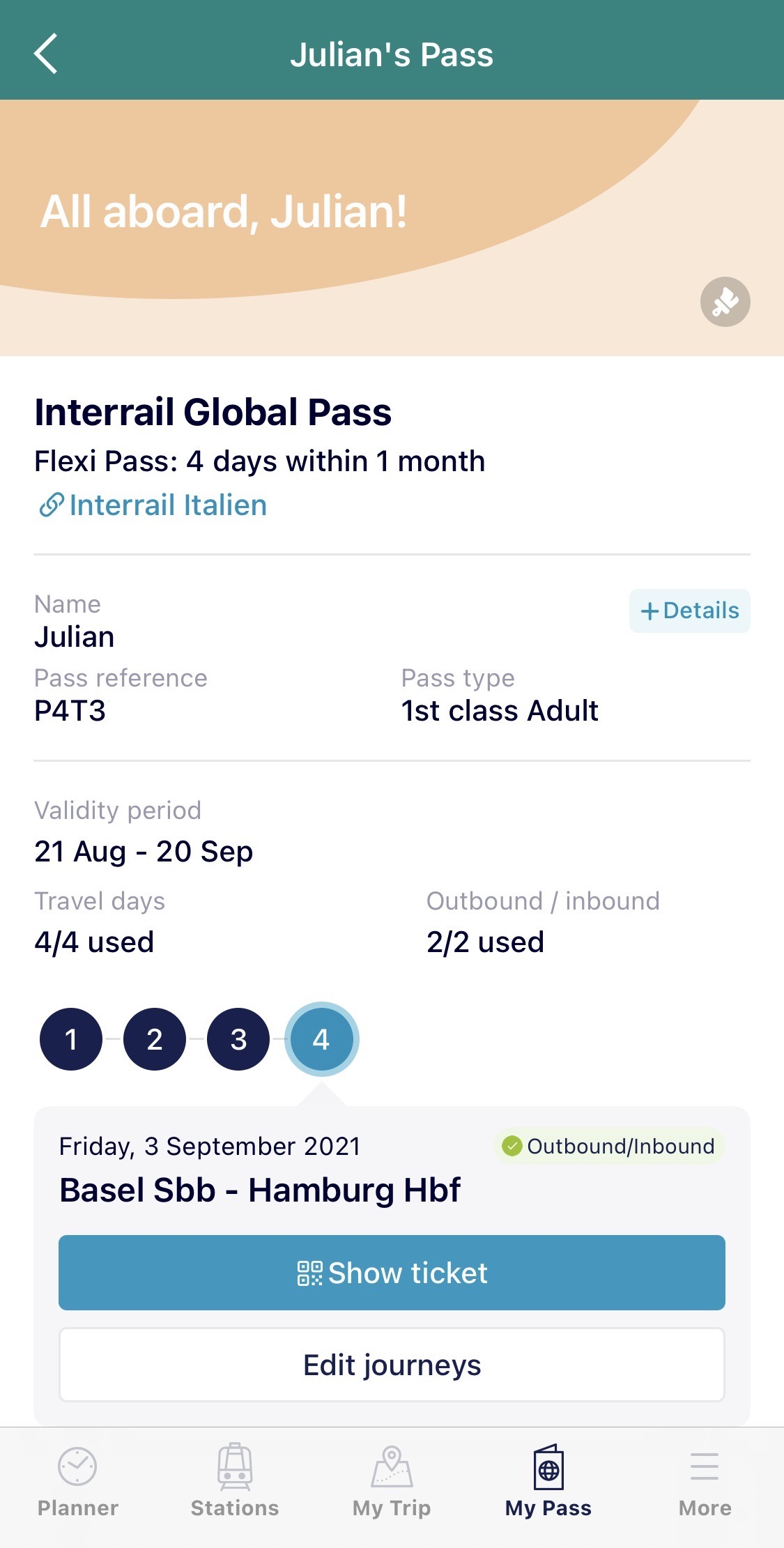
Mobile Pass, a flexible Global Pass in this case

Passes were originally introduced as a paper ticket, and are still available in this format. Travellers can now also travel using a digital ticket in Interrail's Rail Planner app (in most territories).

=== Flexible vs Continuous ===
Passes include a certain number of 'travel days' within an overall validity period. On a valid travel day, any number of trains may be boarded - an overnight train only counts on the day of departure.

On flexible passes, each day may be activated individually at any time by the traveller. On continuous passes (which cover more extended periods of travel), all days within the validity period are valid travel days.

=== Global Pass ===
The flagship product is the Global Pass, which allows travellers to cross the borders of all included countries by train on the pass.

==== Restrictions on travel in the country of residence ====
Until the end of 2015, Interrail passes were not valid in the traveller's country of residence, although a discount was granted on journeys to or from the border.

On 1 January 2016, the pass became valid for two free journeys in the traveller's country of residence: one to and one from the border. The limit exists to prevent people from using Interrail for work commuting and business travel.

Since Eurail was merged into Interrail, non-European residents travel as if they do not have a country of residence: there is no restriction on trips in any country for non-European residents.

==== Validity ====
The Interrail Global Pass has the following validity options:

- 4 days within one month
- 5 days within one month
- 7 days within one month
- 10 days within two months
- 15 days within two months
- 15 days (continuous)
- 22 days (continuous)
- 1 month (continuous)
- 2 months (continuous)
- 3 months (continuous)

=== One Country Pass ===
Unlike the Global Pass, this pass only permits travel within one country (or, in some cases, a group of countries).

There is a pass available for each of the 33 countries, except the following:

- Bosnia and Herzegovina, and Montenegro: these are not available as One Country Passes
- Belgium, Luxembourg, and the Netherlands: these are grouped into the Benelux One Country Pass

Two additional passes are available:

- Nordic: including Denmark, Sweden, Norway, and Finland
- Greek Islands: does not include any rail travel, but instead includes participating ferries between the islands (which is not available in the Global Pass)

Only European residents can purchase the One Country Passes for Great Britain and Switzerland. This is to protect the independent rail passes available for those countries, such as BritRail.

All One Country Passes have varying choices of validity and travel days, but all are of the flexible type.

== Reservations ==
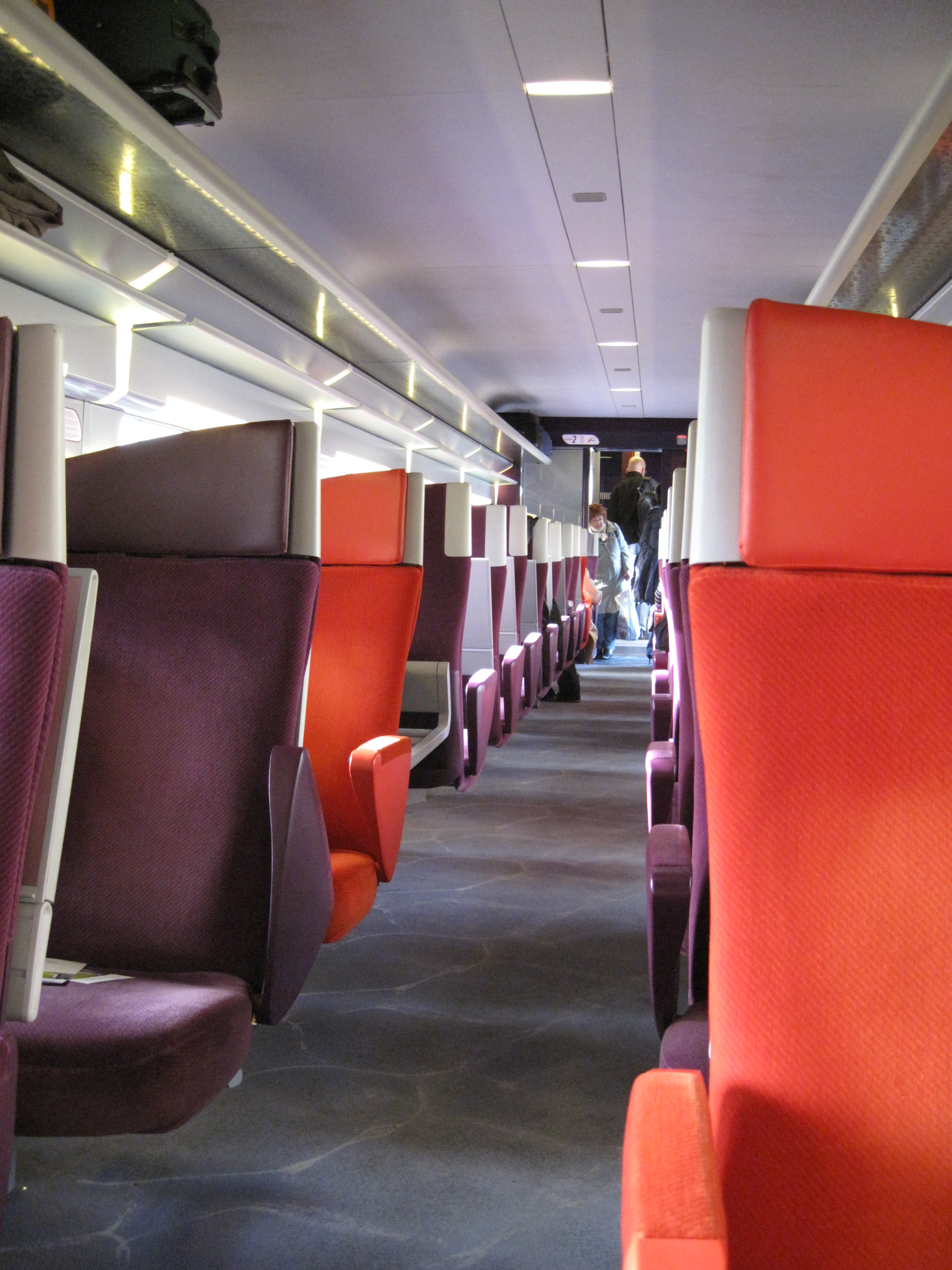
TGV seating

With an Interrail pass, reservations are usually not required for local and regional trains; however, reservations are needed for most high-speed, international, and night trains. Surcharges are required in many countries to guarantee seat reservations and other benefits, such as meals, drinks, free Wi-Fi, and access to first-class lounges. These reservations can usually be avoided by taking regional or local trains.

Whilst there is no unified system for reservations, Interrail does operate its own reservation booking site (which does not synchronize with information about a traveller's pass except for checking that it is valid) which can book many reservations that travellers might require, for an additional fee to the reservation. Reservations can also usually be made (usually for a lower cost) directly with the railway undertaking (such as on their website and/or at stations).

=== High-speed trains ===
Many high-speed trains require reservation and, sometimes, an extra fee sold as a supplement or pass-holder fare:

- Eurostar (UK routes, between London and Paris, Amsterdam, and Brussels) services require a compulsory reservation. 2nd class pass holders can travel in Standard class only, 1st class pass holders can travel in either Standard or Eurostar Plus class. It isn't possible to travel in Eurostar Premier with an Interrail pass. Pass holder fares are quota controlled so it is possible for a train to sell out of pass holder fares before the service is actually fully booked.
- All other Eurostar services (formerly Thalys) services require a compulsory reservation. 2nd class pass holders can travel in Standard class only, 1st class pass holders can travel in either Eurostar Plus class, the latter, while at no extra cost, is on a first-come first-served basis.
- TGV (France): TGV inOui (French Domestic), TGV Lyria (France ↔ Switzerland), TGV France-Italie (France ↔ Italy), Elipsos (France ↔ Spain) and Alleo (France ↔ Luxembourg and Germany) services require a compulsory reservation. The price of the supplement varies from route to route and can also change depending on availability. Passes aren't valid on SNCF's budget Ouigo services.
- Trenitalia (Italy): Frecciabianca, Frecciargento, Frecciarossa, first or second class. Reservations are recommended for intercity trains in Italy.
- AVE (Spain) First and second class. Second-class reservation fees are charged on most other long-distance trains in Spain, such as Arco, Euromed, Alvia, Alaris, and Altaria.
- ICE train reservations are available.
- The SJ high-speed train (in Sweden, to Copenhagen) requires a reservation, and booking two months in advance is recommended.
- Some scenic trains have a panoramic coach, which requires a reservation.

=== Night trains ===
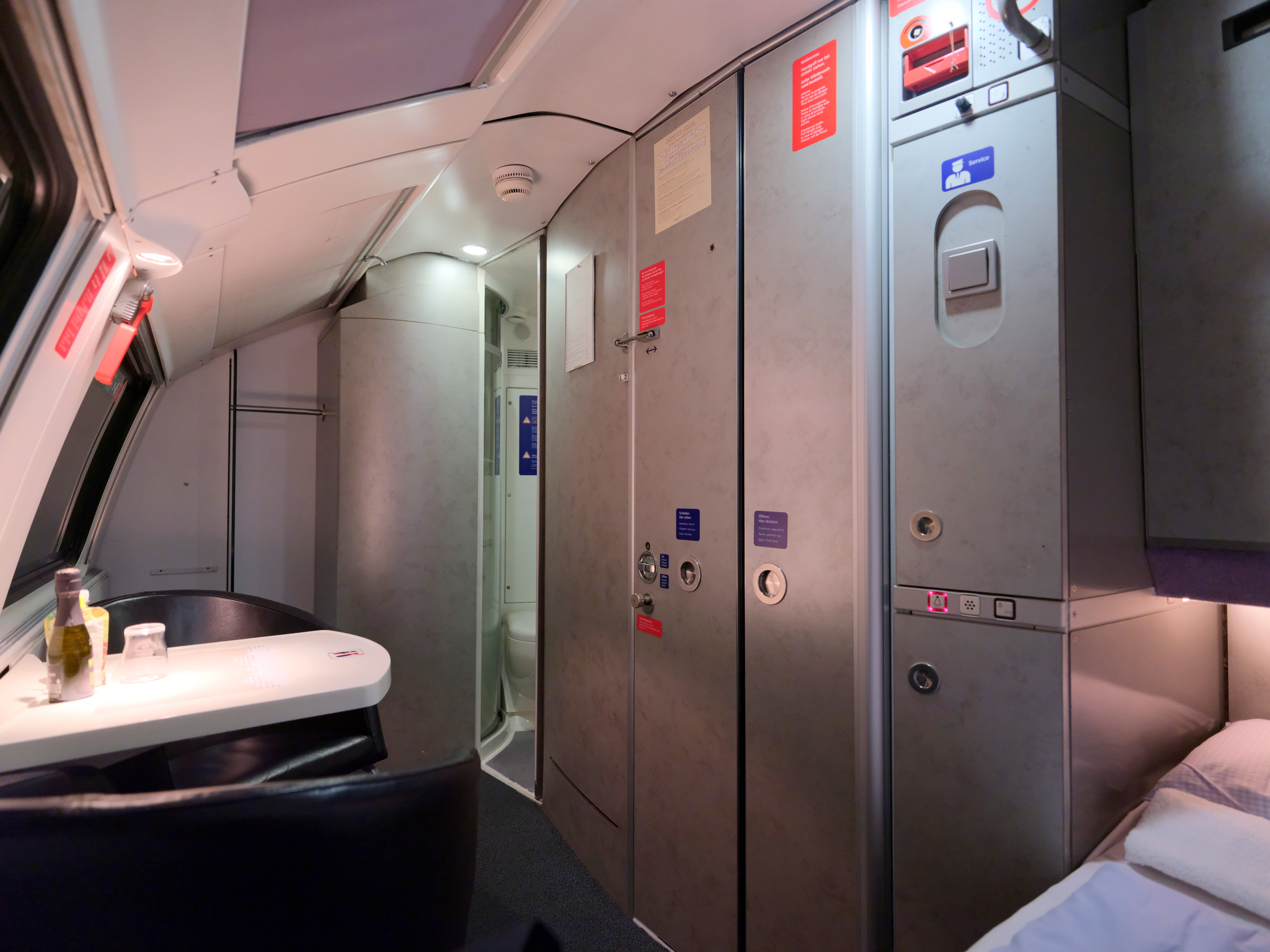
ÖBB Nightjet deluxe sleeper compartment in a double-decker sleeping car

In addition to high-speed trains, many overnight trains (EuroNight, European Sleeper, Nightjet) require reservations (at extra cost) for sleeping accommodations such as couchettes or sleeping cars; some trains have only sleeper cars. A train which travels over one or more days only requires the day of departure to be activated as a travel day - however, the journey must be completed within the overall validity period of the pass.

=== Pass Plus ===
The Pass Plus (Beta) is sold in 3 forms: the Global Pass Plus, the Italy Pass Plus, and the German Rail Pass Plus. These work similarly to the standard Global and One Country Passes respectively, but includes the cost for many reservations required on some services. Reservations still need to be made, but they will be free when made through the Interrail booking system.

The Global Pass Plus also includes a number (three, as of 2026) of credits to spend in exchange for mandatory reservations on some premium services (not including non-seat reservations on night trains and most scenic services), such as some popular cross-border trains in Western Europe.

== Timeline ==
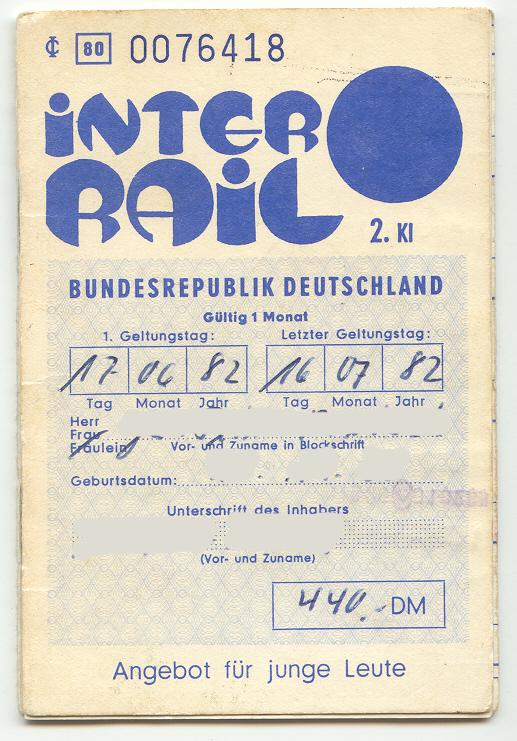
1982 Interrail pass

The idea of international European rail travel tickets developed gradually in the late 19th and early 20th centuries and Various international rail ticketing systems existed in Europe prior to World War I. The concept re-emerged after World War II with the Eurail Pass in 1959 for non-European tourists and the Interrail Pass in 1972, initially for European travelers under the age of 21.

- Late 1800s: The Thomas Cook travel agency began offering "round tickets" to tourists looking to travel throughout Europe.
- Early 1900s: Several European rail operators began offering "Rundreise" tickets on their railroads in order to encourage tourism.
- 1912: The international Rundreise System included France, Belgium, Holland, Germany, Switzerland, Austria, Hungary, the Balkan States, Turkey, Italy, Denmark, Norway, Sweden and Finland. Tickets required a minimum of 600 km / 373 miles for 60 days travel and up to 5,000 km over 120 days.
- 1959: The Eurail Pass was introduced to encourage tourism for passengers from outside of Europe, valid in 13 countries.
- 1972: Interrail Pass began, limited to travellers age 21 or younger. It covered 21 countries: Austria, Belgium, Denmark, East Germany, Finland, France, West Germany, Greece, Hungary, Ireland, Italy, Luxembourg, the Netherlands, Norway, Poland, Portugal, Spain, Sweden, Switzerland, United Kingdom, and Yugoslavia. The price in the United Kingdom was £27.50 for one month's travel.
- 1973: UK price increased to £33.00
- 1976: The age limit for the pass was raised to 23; it was raised again to 26 in 1979.
- 1979: Interrail Senior, for travellers over 65, was introduced.
- 1982: The six-month residency requirement was introduced.
- 1985: Some ferry services were included.

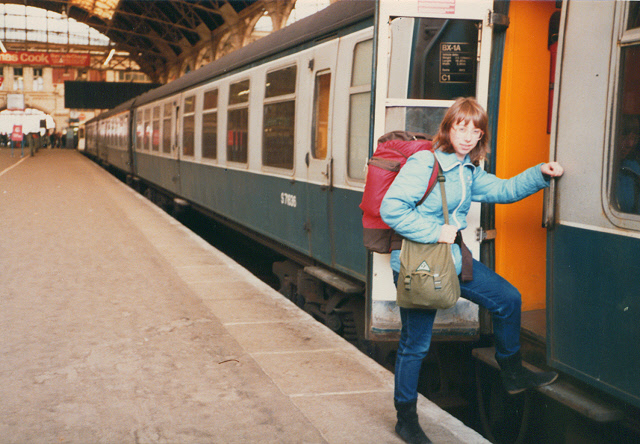
1985 Interrail traveller at London Victoria

- 1989: An adult offer was introduced in the Nordic countries, with 265 adult passengers in the first year.
- 1991: The end of the Soviet Union led to expansion of the Interrail zone, and an adult offer was introduced in the UK.
- 1994: Twenty-nine of the 33 present-day countries are included (all except Bosnia-Herzegovina); the IRC has seven zones, with Zone D including Poland, Czech Republic, Slovakia, Hungary, Croatia, Bulgaria, Romania, and Yugoslavia.
- 1998: Interrail passes become available to all ages, with fares based on age. The eight-zone system is established, omitting Bosnia-Herzegovina.
- 2001: The Eurail Group is formed, taking over marketing and management of Interrail and Eurail.
- 2005: Bosnia-Herzegovina joins the IRC.
- 2007: On April 1, the Eurail Group takes over all Interrail Pass products; zone system replaced with Interrail Global Pass (30 participating countries) and One Country Pass range. Eurodomino discontinued.
- 2008: Slovenian and Croatian railways join, and the pass becomes valid in 20 countries.
- 2009: 50th Anniversary Eurail Pass, valid in 21 countries.
- 2013: Launch of the Rail Planner app
- 2015: Eurail and Interrail align their logos. Greek Islands Pass introduced.
- 2017: Youth fare age limit raised to 27. Eurostar joins the Eurail Group.
- 2018: Turkey and Serbia join Eurail One-country Pass. Czech Republic and Poland join Eurail two-country select pass. Lithuanian railways joined Interrail.
- 2019: 1st and 2nd class are available for all products (except Greek Islands domestic). The New Greek Islands Pass is now also valid for 5 domestic trips and increases to 53 islands. It was announced that railway operators in the United Kingdom would cease participation in the scheme after a dispute, however this decision was promptly reversed. Eurail Group GIE and Eurail.com join forces and continue activities as Eurail B.V.
- 2020: Estonia and Latvia join Interrail.
- 2022: Interrail and Eurail introduce a new joint logo along with a brand identity refresh.
- 2026: Eurail B.V renamed to Interrail B.V in May; the Eurail brand was dropped on 10 September 2026.

== DiscoverEU ==
In 2015, German activists Vincent-Immanuel Herr and Martin Speer approached European Commission vice-president Frans Timmermans with a proposal to provide all EU youth with a free one-month Interrail Global Pass at age 18. Their effort was documented by Politico Europe's Brussels Playbook. According to Herr and Speer, their idea would help to overcome stereotypes in Europe and problems with nationalism in several countries by enabling a whole generation (not just a small fraction of it) to explore Europe. They subsequently wrote a number of articles about their idea, started a change.org petition, and approached more EU politicians.

The idea was picked up by a number of EU politicians in 2016, including Rebecca Harms, Karima Delli, Michael Cramer, István Ujhelyi, Manfred Weber, and Alexander Graf Lambsdorff. A 2016 German survey found that 56 percent of respondents were in favor of such a proposal, and Herr promoted the idea at a 2017 TEDx event.

In March 2018, a €12 million pilot project to purchase 20,000-30,000 Global Passes for EU youth was confirmed by the European Commission. A press release announcing the decision elaborated on its goal of the scheme: "The action will seek to offer young people, regardless of social or educational background and including people with reduced mobility, a chance to travel abroad." On 1 March 2018, the European Commission announced initial steps to implement the European Parliament's proposal for a "Free Interrail pass for Europeans turning 18" by adopting a financing decision:

"With a budget of EUR 12 million in 2018, this action is expected to give an estimated 20,000-30,000 young people a travel experience that would help foster a European identity, reinforce common European values and promote the discovery of European sites and cultures. This proposal fits well with the EU's ambitions to promote learning mobility, active citizenship, social inclusion and solidarity of all young people."

On 3 May 2018, Commissioner for Education, Culture, Youth and Sport Tibor Navracsics and Manfred Weber MEP announced that the initiative would be called DiscoverEU and outlined the first details on the application process. The initiative aims to give 15,000 young people the opportunity to travel around Europe during the summer to discover the continent's rich cultural heritage, get in touch with other people, learn from other cultures, and discover what unites Europe. Participants can travel up to 30 days and visit one to four foreign destinations. In an application round to select the first 15,000 travelers, those interested needed to apply during a two-week period in June 2018 through the European Youth Portal.

== See also ==
- Indrail Pass – a similar railway ticket for travel on Indian Railways
- Japan Rail Pass – a similar railway ticket valid for travel on all major forms of transportation provided by the JR Group
- Korea Rail Pass – a similar railway ticket valid for travel on all major forms of transportation provided by Korail
- BritRail – a similar railway ticket valid for travel in Great Britain
- Rail transport in Europe
- Transport in Europe
- The Man in Seat Sixty-One
