= Korea Rail Pass =

The Korea Rail Pass (Korean: 한국 철도패스; Hangug Cheoldo Paeseu, or Korean: 코리아 레일 패스; Koria Reil Paeseu), also commonly called the KR Pass (Korean: KR패스; KR Paeseu), is a rail pass offered by Korail (Korea Railroad Corporation), the national railway operator of South Korea. The pass is offered exclusively to foreign visitors and is valid for most of the rail lines operated by Korail in the designated period, including KTX, the high-speed railway in South Korea. However, the pass is not valid for subways and tourist trains, even when they are also operated by Korail (e.g. the subway and commuter lines in Seoul operated by Korail).

== History ==
The pass was first issued in late 1999 by Korean National Railroad (대한민국 철도청), the predecessor of Korail. The pass was initially launched for visitors from the United States, but it was sold also to Japanese visitors in 2000. Therefore, selling points were set up only in these two countries. In 2001, Korean National Railroad started to set up selling points in other countries, with 15 more countries added to the list in late 2001. The pass is available to all foreign visitors now.

At first, the pass was a hand-written ticket, but it was changed to a magnetic ticket when KTX opened, so that the tickets can be used at automatic ticket gates. There were only three-, five-, seven- and ten-day passes initially, and a further one-day pass was added in February 2011.

== Rail Pass ==
There are three different types of pass, namely, the Normal Pass, the Saver Pass and the Youth Pass. The Saver Pass is for two to five persons travelling together, while the Youth Pass is for persons who are 13 to 25 years old. The price of Saver Pass and Youth Pass is roughly 90% and 80% of the Normal Pass, respectively. For children between four and twelve years old, a Normal Pass can be brought at half of the normal price.

The pass is also offered for various periods of time. Currently, there are passes for one, three, five, seven and ten days. The pass must be used in consecutive days. During the designated period of time, pass holders can travel with nearly all trains operated by Korail, including KTX, without additional charge. Additional charge should be paid, if travellers want to travel with the first class; but the pass also offer a 50% discount for first-class seats reservation.

The table below summarizes the prices for each pass.(2017 year) The amounts are listed in South Korean Won.

Pass		2 Days	3 Days	4 Days	5 Days
Normal Pass	Adult	₩121,000	₩138,000	₩193,000	₩210,000
Normal Pass	Child (4–12 years old)	₩61,000	₩69,000	₩97,000	₩105,000
Saver Pass (2–5 persons traveling together)		₩111,000	₩128,000	₩183,000	₩200,000

A child under the age of 4 need not pay for a seat. The Youth Pass can also be used by students holding International Student Identity Card.

== Limitations of use ==
KR Pass is available only to foreigners and not to Koreans. Koreans who possess foreign citizenship or long-term business visas, however, can also use the pass. Foreigners who get long-term visa in South Korea and live there for more than six months are also ineligible.

The pass can be used throughout the year; however, economy seats could be unavailable during peak seasons, especially during the Lunar New Year, Thanksgiving Day, summer vacation and year-end and the beginning of the year. Service for seat reservation for the pass holders is even stopped on KTX, Saemaeul (새마을), or Mugunghwa (무궁화) trains during the peak seasons. Stand room is usually still available.

The following lines are operated by Korail, but they are not covered by the pass because they are considered part of the Seoul Metropolitan Subway system.

- Gyeongin Line (1900- conventional rail); 경인선 (Guro-Incheon); 구로-인천 is connected with Line 1
- Ansan Line (1988- conventional rail); 안산선 (Geumjeong-Oido); 금정-오이도 is connected with Line 4
- Gwacheon Line (1994- underground); 과천선 (Seonbawi-Geumjeong); 선바위-금정 is connected with Line 4
- Bundang Line (1994- underground); 분당선 (Wangsimni-Mangpo); 왕십리-망포
- Ilsan Line (1996- partially underground); 일산선 (Jichuk-Daehwa); 지축-대화 is connected with Line 3
- Gyeongwon Line; 경원선 (Soyosan-Hoegi); 소요산-회기 is connected with Line 1 and (Cheongnyangni-Yongsan); 청량리-용산 is part of the Jungang Line
- Gyeongbu Line; 경부선 (Namyeong-Cheonan); 남영-천안 is connected with Line 1
- Janghang Line; 장항선 (Cheonan-Sinchang); 천안-신창 is connected with Line 1
- Jungang Line; 중앙선 (Cheongnyangni-Yongmun); 청량리-용문 is part of the Jungang Line
- Gyeongui Line; 경의선 (Seoul Station-Munsan); 서울-문산 is part of the Gyeongui Line

The KR Pass is a registered pass that cannot be used by any other individual. Passengers must present their passport prior to each use. KR Pass cannot be reissued if lost.

== Purchase ==
The pass can be purchased at the official website of Korail or at appointed travel agencies outside of Korea, where one could get a voucher or e-ticket that is used to exchange for the pass in major train stations in Korea. E-tickets or vouchers must be exchanged for KR Passes within 180 days of making the reservation or else the reservation would automatically be canceled.

== Other benefits ==
Pass holders also have discounts in booking designated hotels, visiting certain sight-seeing point or exchanging money in designated banks.

== Happy Rail Pass ==
As KR Pass can only be used by foreigners living in South Korea for less than six months, Korail (코레일) offers a parallel rail pass called Happy Rail Pass to those foreigners living there for a longer period of time at a relatively higher price. The pass offers only the options of one, three or five days use, but Saver Pass, Youth Pass and children discount for Normal Pass are still available. The price of the passes is as follows.

Pass		2 Day	3 Days	5 Days
Normal Pass	Adult	₩95,700	₩107,800	₩179,900
Normal Pass	Child (4–12 years old)	₩47,900	₩53,900	₩89,900
Saver Pass (2–5 persons traveling together)		₩86,100	₩97,000	₩161,900
Youth Pass (13–25 years old)		₩78,600	₩86,300	₩143,900

== See also ==
- Rail transport in South Korea
- Japan Rail Pass
- Eurail
- Interail
- Indrail Pass
