= Railroad Wash (Gold Gulch tributary) =

Waterway in Cochise County, Arizona

Railroad Wash is a tributary ephemeral stream or wash (or arroyo) of Gold Gulch in Cochise County, Arizona. Its mouth is below its confluence with Gold Gulch, at an elevation of 3,852 feet / 1,174 meters near Creighton Reservoir. Its source is located at an elevation of 4,439 feet, at 32°20′16″N 109°44′34″W on a hill on the south side of Railroad Pass.
