= Arco (Renfe Operadora service) =

Passenger train service

Arco was a commercial, locomotive-hauled passenger train service operated in Spain by Renfe on the Levante and Basque Country-Galicia lines.

== Routes ==
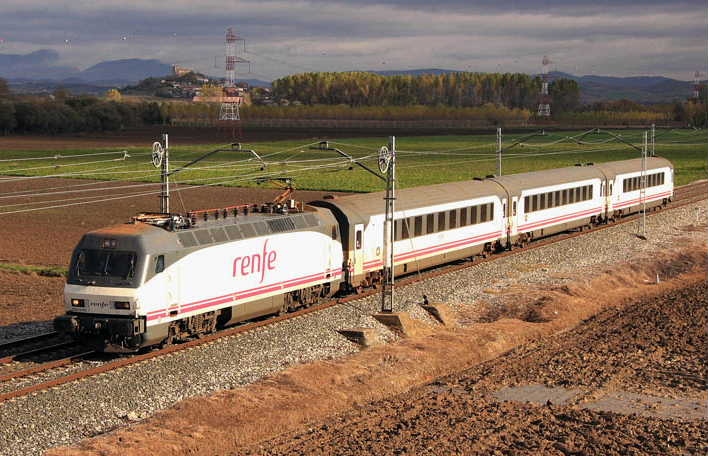
Arco trainset on the Madrid–Hendaye railway

The Renfe Arco services used to run on the following routes:

- La Coruña / Vigo - Bilbao / San Sebastian - Hendaye (Arco Camino de Santiago)
- La Coruña - Monforte de Lemos
- Barcelona - Castellón - Córdoba - Sevilla / Málaga (Arco García Lorca)
- Linares-Baeza - Granada / Almeria

Until 2 May 2008, the trains were operating on the Mediterranean corridor, between Barcelona, Alicante and Murcia. There was also an Arco train service from Porbou / Cerbere (France) and Valencia Nord.

On 10 September 2011 the Arco service on the route between Barcelona and Granada/Málaga/Sevilla/Badajoz (García Lorca) was replaced by the Alaris service.

On 2 March 2020 the brand Arco was permanently retired when the last remaining service on the route Camino de Santiago ceased operations.

== Technical data ==
Arco fully renovated and refurbished Renfe's B11x-10200 series of passenger trains. New bogies, capable of working at 220 km/h, were added. The bogies are modified versions of model GC-1 by CAF, also known as GC-3, allowing a higher degree of comfort at higher speeds.

- Operated lines:
- Manufacturers: Renfe, CAF
- Units manufactured: 41
- Year established: 1999
- Top speed: 220 km/h
- Commercial Speed: 200 km/h
- Beam heating: Yes, 3 kV (CC)
- Gauge: 1,668 mm
