= Rail pass =

Transit ticket for multiple trips by rail

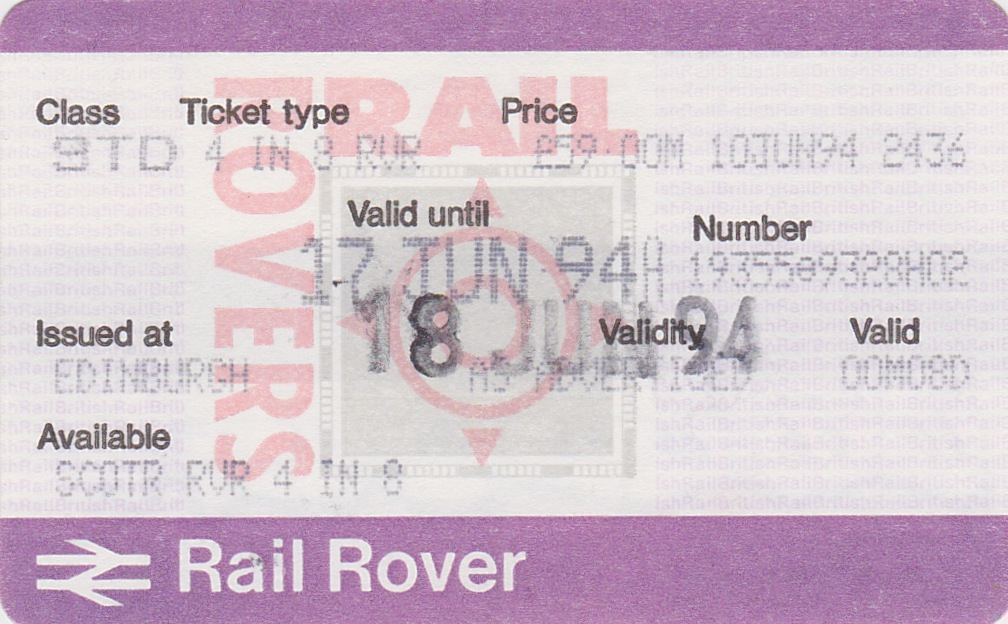
UK rail rover

A rail pass is a pass that covers the cost of train travel in a certain designated area or areas within a certain period of time. It is contrasted to a point-to-point ticket in that it allows the holder unlimited travel, within the pre-designated area and period, while a point-to-point ticket only permits the holder to travel from a point to another once. It is different from a season ticket in the sense that, while both of them grant unlimited travel to the holder, season tickets normally target commuting travellers, whereas rail passes usually target tourists. Based on this difference, terms of use are thus normally set differently.

The first rail pass was issued as the Eurail pass in March 1959. Owing to its success, many other passes have been issued by various railway companies all around the world since then.

== Type of rail pass ==
Rail passes are issued according to different terms of use.

=== Continuous pass and Flexipass ===
There are two ways of counting the valid period of a rail pass. A continuous pass counts the days or months continuously. For example, a 15-day pass is valid for 15 continuous calendar days starting from the day of validation and a one-month pass is valid for a calendar month (so if it is used in February, it is valid only for 28/29 days, contrasted to the 30-day valid period when using a 30-day pass).

As continuous pass might not be useful to all travellers, as many of them do not travel every day, there exists also the flexipass, which allows the holder to only pay for the days they travel. For instance, when a traveller buy a ten-day-in-one-month flexipass, the pass is valid for one month, and he can pick whichever ten days within the valid period to travel with the pass. This gives extra flexibility to the holders. Usually the holder would need to fill in the date he travels on the pass before boarding on the train.

=== Area ===
Some countries offer a country pass to travellers such that they could take most of the trains in the country (e.g. BritRail Pass, Japan Rail Pass, Indrail Pass, Korea Rail Pass, etc.). But some countries offer cross-countries rail pass such that pass holders can travel on trains within the designated countries, even crossing the border (e.g. Eurail pass and Interrail). Some countries offer passes which are valid only within certain areas of the country (e.g. JR West Rail Pass, JR Kyushu Rail Pass, etc.).

Sometimes, if the train passes through areas where the pass is not valid, travellers would need to pay for that section of the route. For example, if one gets a pass that is valid in Spain and Italy, and would like to take a train from Spain to Italy passing through France, he may need to pay for the French section.

=== Concession and group pass ===
Some countries offer concession pass to youth (e.g. age below 26) or elderly. And some other offer group passes, allowing two or more persons to travel together with a lower price (though some may require that all named persons must be travelling together).

Concession pass might get more restrictions. For example, one can travel on the Tze-Chiang Limited Express, the fastest train operated by the Taiwan Railways Administration, with the normal TR Pass but not with the Student Pass.

=== Class ===
Some passes allow the traveller to travel with both first and second class, but some are restricted to travel in the second-class only, although some might be offered with the option to travel in first-class by paying a supplement.

=== Type of trains ===
There could be limitation on the types of trains that one can ride with the rail pass. For example, high-speed trains are excluded in some countries (e.g. TR Pass), and in some other, one can travel on them by paying supplement (e.g. France Rail Pass).

Passengers with a Japan Rail Pass can ride on the Shinkansen, the high-speed railway in Japan. However, they cannot take Nozomi and Mizuho trains, the fastest train services on the Tōkaidō, San'yō and Kyūshū Shinkansen lines.

=== Sleeping / Couchette car ===
In some countries, rail pass holders can travel on sleeper or couchette compartment freely, while some may need to pay some extra fee or are totally restricted from taking sleeper or couchette trains.

=== Seat reservation ===
Some pass allow the holders to make seat reservation on trains freely, while some require the holders to pay a supplement.

== Bonus ==
As tourists are the typical target group of rail passes, there may be bonus discounts in certain sightseeing spots, by showing a rail pass within the valid period. In order to enjoy the discount, some flexipasses require the holder to spend a travel day - fill-in that date on the pass - while others do not; some of the passes also cover the cost of travelling by certain buses, ferries or cable cars.

== Difference from season ticket ==
A rail pass is different from a season ticket: the former is generally marketed to tourists while the latter is usually marketed to commuters. The terms of use and purchase are set accordingly.

Very often, rail passes cannot be used by the local citizens and might not even be available for purchase within their area of use. Another difference is the term of the pass: while it is difficult to find rail pass valid for more than three months, it is common to find season ticket valid for a whole year.

Designed for commuting, some season tickets are valid for only one route, while a rail pass is usually valid for an entire area.

== Rail passes ==
Rail passes on offer include:

- Eurail Pass (Europe, for non-European citizens)
- Interrail Pass (Europe, for European citizens)
- Japan Rail Pass (Japan)
- USA Rail Pass (United States)
- BritRail Pass (United Kingdom)
- Korea Rail Pass (South Korea)
- TR Pass (Taiwan)
- Indrail Pass (India), discontinued
