= Indrail Pass =

Discontinued rail pass for foreign tourists in India

An Indrail Pass was a special railway pass available to foreign nationals created along the lines of the Eurail Pass for unlimited travel without reservation of a ticket on the Indian Railways network. This ticket was available for purchase in time periods from half a day to 90 days and in 3 classes.

As of 19 September 2017 by Railway Board order, Indrail passes have been discontinued.

Fare in US dollars
Period of Validity	AC 1		First Class/ AC-2 Tier/ AC-3 Tier/ AC Chair Car		Sleeper Class/ Second Class (Non-AC)	
--	Adult	Child	Adult	Child	Adult	Child
Half Day	57	29	26	13	11	6
One Day	95	47	43	22	19	10
Two Days	160	80	70	35	30	15
4 Days	220	110	110	55	50	25
7 Days	270	135	135	68	80	40
15 Days	370	185	185	95	90	45
21 Days	396	198	198	99	100	50
30 Days	495	248	248	126	125	65
60 Days	800	400	400	200	185	95
90 Days	1,060	530	530	265	235	120
