= Alaris =

Spanish railway brand

Overview
- Locale: Madrid and Valencia, Spain
- Transit type: Regional rail

Operation
- Operator: RENFE

Alaris was the brand name of the regional rail network run by the Spanish national rail company Renfe Operadora that connected the major cities of Madrid and Valencia, and Barcelona and the main cities of the Valencian community, between 1999 and 2013.

== History ==
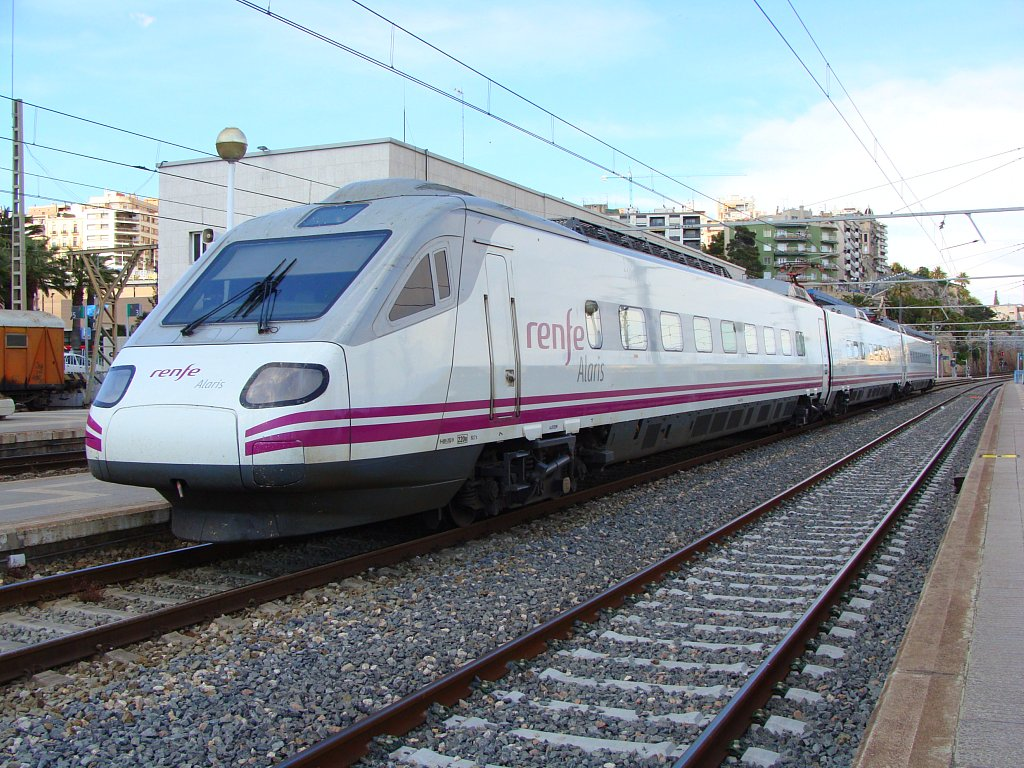
A former Alaris trainset at Tarragona.

In 2008, the service was partially provided with Series 120 units, and since 2009 S130 and S490 units have been used interchangeably. Since September 12, 2011, two Alaris S490s have replaced the Arco García Lorca to Seville and the Arco to Malaga. Although they have better performance, the change has generated criticism due to the lower capacity of the new Alaris. Starting in 2013, Alaris was gradually replaced by the renewed Renfe Intercity system.
