= Railroad Pass (Cochise County, Arizona) =

Mountain pass in Cochise County, Arizona

Coordinates: 32°20′38″N 109°44′37″W

Railroad Pass is a mountain pass in Cochise County, Arizona. It divides the Dos Cabezas Mountains and the Pinaleno Mountains at an elevation of 4,403 feet / 1,342 meters, and lies between the Sulphur Springs Valley and San Simon Valley.

== History ==
Railroad Pass was named by Lt. John Parke who led the Pacific Railroad Survey 32nd parallel expedition to determine the route of the southernmost route of the transcontinental railroad through southern New Mexico Territory in 1855. It is now the route taken by the Southern Pacific Railroad and Interstate 10.
