= Japan Rail Pass =

Rail pass for overseas visitors sold by the Japan Railways Group

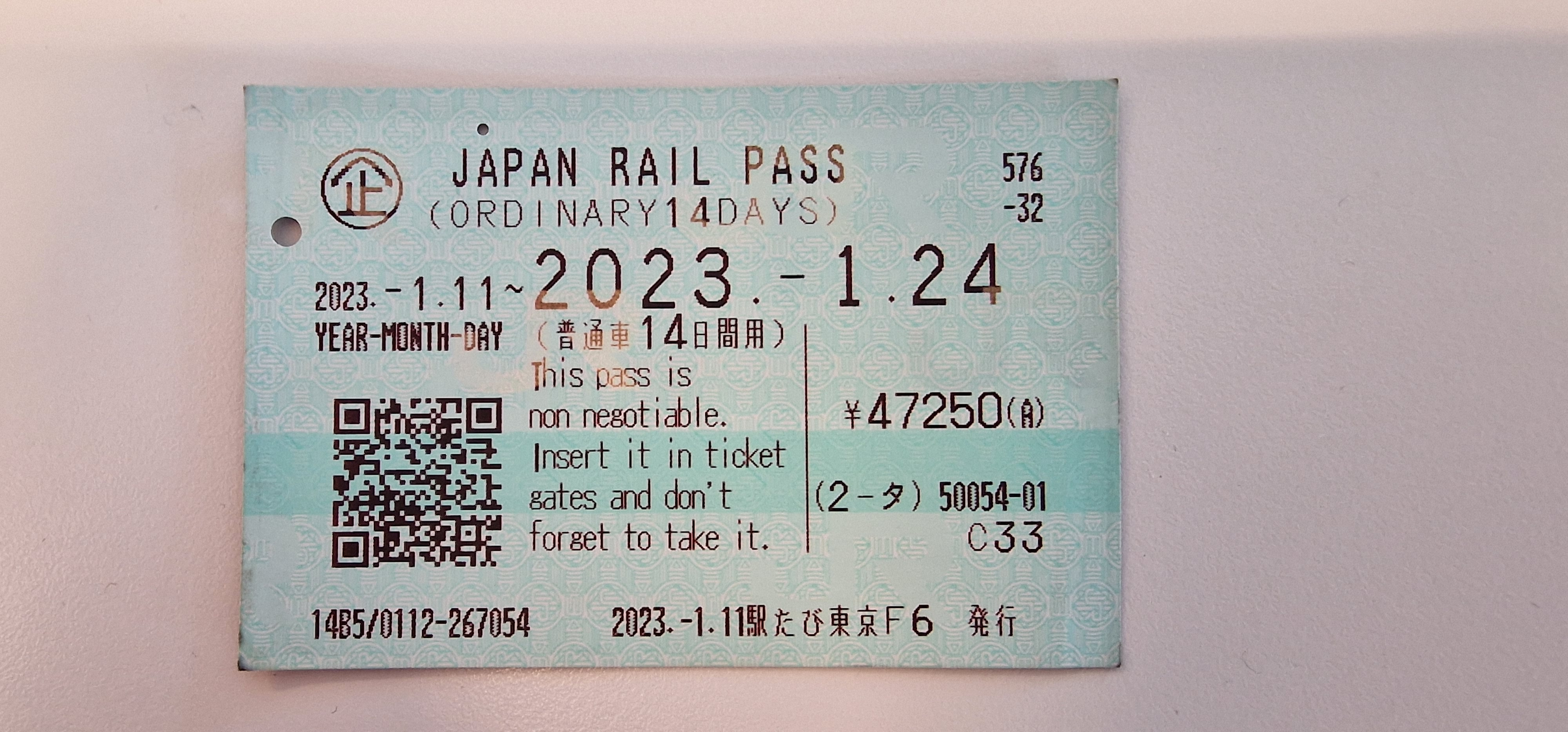
An ordinary Japan Rail Pass issued in January 2023, valid for 14 days

The Japan Rail Pass (ジャパンレールパス, japan rēru pasu), also called the JR Pass, is a rail pass sold by the Japan Railways Group exclusively for overseas visitors. It is valid for travel on all major forms of transportation provided by the JR Group in Japan, with a few exceptions. The pass is designed to stimulate travel and tourism throughout the country. It is cost effective only for long-distance travel, particularly by bullet train. Its use is limited within larger cities, as private operators generally do not accept it.

== Description ==
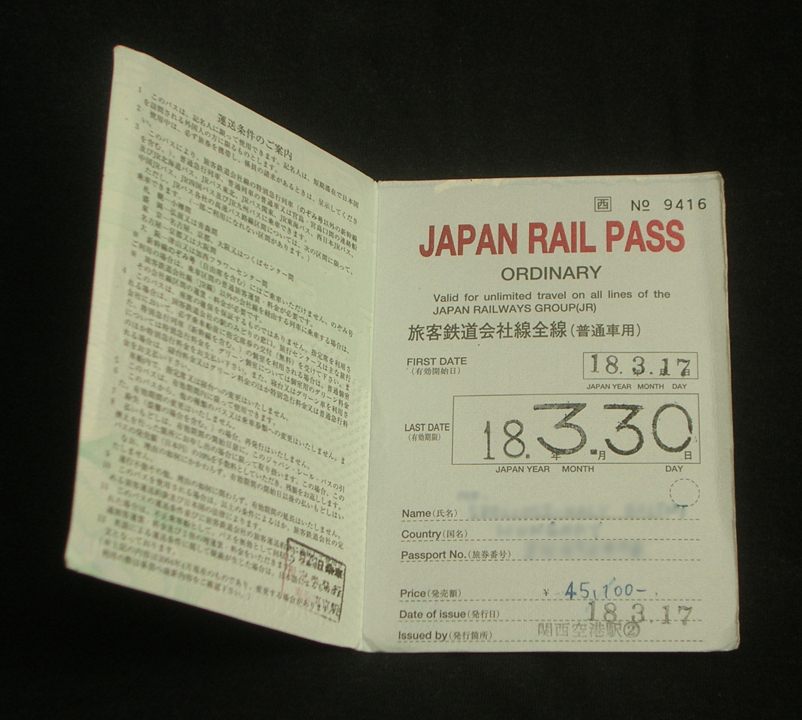
An ordinary Japan Rail Pass issued in 2006 (Heisei year 18).

The national Rail Pass comes in two varieties, one for each class of service, Standard Car (普通車, Futsūsha) and Green Car (グリーン車, Gurīnsha) (first class car). Furthermore, the pass is time limited based on the length of pass purchased. Three time periods are available: seven, fourteen and twenty-one consecutive day passes, which provide the user nearly unlimited use of JR transportation services. The table below summarizes the prices for each pass. The amounts are listed in Japanese yen.

Class		7 Days	14 Days	21 Days
Green Car	Adult	¥70,000	¥111,000	¥140,000
Green Car	Child	¥35,000	¥55,000	¥70,000
Standard Car	Adult	¥50,000	¥80,000	¥100,000
Standard Car	Child	¥25,000	¥40,000	¥50,000

The pass can either be purchased on the official reservation website, or from an authorized agency outside of Japan.

When the pass is bought online, the start date for the validity period is selected during the purchase process. The traveller must pick up the actual pass at a dedicated ticket office.

When buying the pass through an agency, the traveller receives a paper "Exchange Order" which must be exchanged for the actual pass within 90 days of purchase, again at one of the designated ticket offices. When using the Exchange Order, the traveller can select the beginning of the validity period at the time of exchange.

The sale of Exchange Orders is scheduled to cease at the end of 2025, after which the pass will only be available through the official website.

== Valid transportation ==
The pass is valid for travel on Japan Railways Group (JR) transportation throughout the country in the class of service indicated on the pass.

=== Train ===
The pass is valid on all JR-operated lines, including the Shinkansen, limited express (特急, Tokkyū) trains and regular commuter services, including Local (普通, Futsū) and Rapid (快速, Kaisoku) trains.

The following limited stop Shinkansen services require an additional special ticket to be purchased:

- Nozomi service on the Tōkaidō and San'yō lines (Tokyo-Osaka-Hakata)
- Mizuho service on the San'yō and Kyushu lines (Osaka-Hakata-Kagoshima-Chūō)

The pass is valid on the following non-JR lines:

- Tokyo Monorail between Hamamatsuchō and Haneda Airport
- Aoimori Railway, for the following journeys (local and rapid services only):
  - Starting and ending at Hachinohe and Aomori
  - Starting and ending at Hachinohe and Noheji, or Aomori and Noheji, in order to access the JR East Ōminato Line
- Hapi-Line Fukui for journeys starting and ending at Fukui and Echizen-Hanandō only, in order to access the JR West Etsumi-Hoku Line (Kuzuryū Line)
- IR Ishikawa Railway for journeys starting and ending at Kanazawa and Tsubata only, in order to access the JR West Nanao Line
- Ainokaze Toyama Railway for journeys starting and ending at Toyama and Takaoka only, in order to access the JR West Johana Line and Himi Line (local services only)
- Tokyo Metro Chiyoda Line between Ayase Station and Kita-Senju Station, as this portion of the Tokyo Metro Chiyoda Line is considered a part of the Jōban Line

=== Bus ===
The pass is valid on the local routes of the following bus companies:

- JR Hokkaido Bus Company
- JR Bus Tohoku Company
- JR Bus Kantō Company
- JR Tōkai Bus Company
- West JR Bus Company
- Chūgoku JR Bus Company
- JR Shikoku Bus Company
- JR Kyushu Bus Company

It is not valid on JR highway buses and Community buses which JR Bus is entrusted.

=== Ferry ===
The pass is also valid for travel on JR Ferry service on the following route:

- Miyajima – Miyajimaguchi

=== Eligibility ===
The pass is only meant to be used by tourists, and is therefore only available to people meeting one of two criteria:

- A foreign tourist visiting Japan, who has a passport bearing the "Temporary Visitor" entry status stamped at immigration, and who can present the actual passport at the time of exchange. A photocopy of the passport is not acceptable.
- People who have both their Japanese passport and written proof—obtained from the embassy or legation of Japan in the foreign country where they live—that they have been living legally in the country for 10 consecutive years or more.

JR staff will check the eligibility of the user during the pick-up or exchange process.

== Conditions of use ==
The Rail Pass is valid on almost all forms of transportation (train, bus and ferry) operated by the companies of the JR Group. However, there are exceptions and conditions of use of the Rail Pass.

- The Rail Pass is non-transferable and can only be used by the person designated on the pass.
- The user must present his/her passport upon request.
- Starting on 1 June 2020, the pass is issued on a standard green JR ticket, allowing automatic ticket gates to be used. Previously, Rail Pass holders had their tickets laminated to an A6 card and needed to enter and exit stations through a staffed gate presenting their pass to a ticketing officer.
- Seat reservations can be made without additional payment. Seat reservations can be made at all JR Midori no Madoguchi ticket offices. Starting on 1 June 2020, reservations can also be made using a Reserved Seat Vending Machine.
- In the event that an Exchange Order or a Japan Rail Pass is lost or stolen, no replacements can be provided.
- Use of a private compartment is not covered by the Rail Pass and requires an additional charge.
- Use of a sleeping compartment on overnight trains is not covered by the Rail Pass and requires payment of the limited express fare and the accommodation charge.
- Before 1 October 2023, usage of the Nozomi and Mizuho services on the Tokaido, Sanyo and Kyushu Shinkansen lines was not covered by the Japan Rail Pass and required the full fare purchase. Those services began to be covered by the pass on that date, but supplementary tickets are still required for a small fee.
- Use of the Gran Class car on the Tohoku, Hokkaido, Joetsu and Hokuriku Shinkansen lines requires the payments of the Shinkansen express charge and the Gran Class surcharge.
- Use of the DX Green Car by JR Kyushu or the Premium Green Car on the Saphir Odoriko limited express service by JR East requires the payments of the limited express charge and the DX Green / Premium Green Car surcharge.
- Some trains, such as the Narita Express, the Hayabusa, Komachi and Kagayaki services on the Tohoku, Hokkaido, Akita and Hokuriku Shinkansen lines, and the Sunrise Seto/Sunrise Izumo overnight limited express services, require mandatory seat reservations, which are free of charge.
- The Rail Pass does not cover city subways (though local JR lines such as the Yamanote line in Tokyo or the Osaka Loop Line are covered).
- The Rail Pass is good for either 7, 14 or 21 consecutive days, and a day starts and ends at midnight. That means, for example, if a visitor activates his or her pass for immediate use on 1 July at 12 noon, that pass will expire at midnight on 7 July, not 8 July at 12 noon.
- It is possible to activate a Japan Rail Pass with a future date (within 30 days) to be the first day. This allows Japan Rail Pass users to start using their pass within its validity period at any JR station at any time the station is open.
- Even if the Japan Rail Pass expires at midnight, if one is already on a train when it expires, the holder can continue to ride it until he or she gets off at any station or the train reaches its terminus.

== Other information ==
The Japan Rail Pass also allows the holders to obtain discounts when staying at JR Group Hotels.

Regional Rail Passes are also available for JR-Hokkaido, JR-Central, JR-East, JR-West, JR-Shikoku, and JR-Kyushu lines. Unlike the full JR Pass, some regional passes (in particular those sold by JR West) allow holders to travel on Nozomi and Mizuho trains. Some may have limitations on seat reservations, however.

Since 1 October 2023, Japan Rail Pass holders have access to hundreds of discounts and free amenities across Japan, by showing up their JR Pass at the desks or entrance. This is also valid for users who purchased their Japan Rail Pass before 1 October, as long as it has been activated after 1 October 2023.

Since 2020, users of the Japan Rail Pass can make seat reservations for trains over the internet in four languages (English, Korean, Simplified Chinese and Traditional Chinese) and use automatic ticket gates at stations.
