= Outline of public transport =

The following outline is provided as an overview of and topical guide to public transport:

Public transport – transport of passengers by group travel systems available for use by the general public, typically managed on a schedule, operated on established routes, and that charge a posted fee for each trip. Public transport modes include city buses, trolleybuses, trams (or light rail) and passenger trains, rapid transit (metro/subway/underground, etc.) and ferries. Public transport between cities is dominated by airlines, coaches, and intercity rail.

== What type of thing is public transport? ==
Public transport can be described as all of the following:

- Technology – making, usage, and knowledge of tools, machines, techniques, crafts, systems or methods of organization in order to solve a problem or perform a specific function. It can also refer to the collection of such tools, machinery, and procedures.
  - Transport – the movement of humans, animals and goods from one location to another.

== Types of public transport ==
=== Types of public transport, by mode ===
- Airline
- Bush airplane
- Bus
  - Public transport bus service
    - Bus rapid transit
    - Guided bus
    - Public light bus
    - Shuttle bus
    - Transit bus
    - Trolleybus
  - Intercity bus service
  - Charabanc
  - Express bus
  - Open top bus
  - Rail replacement bus
- Rail transport – means of conveyance of passengers and goods by way of wheeled vehicles running on rail tracks consisting of steel rails installed on sleepers/ties and ballast.
  - Intercity rail
  - High-speed rail
  - Regional rail
  - Urban rail transit
    - Commuter rail
    - Rapid transit
    - Rubber-tyred metro
    - Light metro
    - Light rail
    - Interurban
    - Tram-train
    - Street running
    - Tram
  - Cable car (railway)
  - Funicular
  - Heavy rail
  - Heritage railway
    - Heritage streetcar
  - Horsecar
  - Medium-capacity rail system
  - Monorail
- Aerial tramway
- Gondola lift
- Passenger ship
  - Ferry
    - Cable ferry
  - Hovercraft
  - Hydrofoil
  - Ocean liner
  - Water taxi

=== Other forms of publicly available transport ===
- Free public transport
- Personal public transport
  - Personal rapid transit - Proposed form of public transport featuring small automated vehicles operating on a network of specially built guideways.

==== Vehicles for hire ====
- Auto rickshaw - A motorized development of the traditional rickshaw.
- Boda-boda - Bicycle & motorcycle taxis commonly found in East Africa.
- Cycle rickshaw - A local means of transport that are human-powered by pedaling
- Gondola - A traditional, flat-bottomed Venetian rowing boat, well suited to the conditions of the Venetian lagoon.
- Hackney carriage - A carriage or automobile for hire.
- Limousine - A luxury sedan or saloon car driven by a chauffeur and with a partition between the driver and the passenger compartment.
- Motorcycle taxi - A taxi that typically carries one passenger, who rides as the pillion behind the motorcycle operator.
- Paratransit - Special transportation services for people with disabilities, often provided as a supplement to fixed-route bus and rail systems by public transit agencies.
- Pulled rickshaw - A mode of human-powered transport by which a runner draws a two-wheeled cart which seats one or two people.
- Share taxi - Vehicles for hire that are typically smaller than buses and usually take passengers on a fixed or semi-fixed route without timetables, but instead departing when all seats are filled.
- Taxicab - A car used by a single passenger or small group of passengers, often for a non-shared ride.
- Car jockey
- Flexible carpooling
- Ridesharing company
- Slugging
- Vanpool

== History of public transport ==
History of public transport

== General public transport concepts ==
- Transport hub
- Intermodal passenger transport
- Public transport timetable
- Headway
- Farebox recovery ratio
- Passenger load factor
- Patronage (transport)
- Ticket (admission)
  - Airline ticket
  - Train ticket
  - Transit pass
  - Proof-of-payment
  - Free public transport
  - Free travel pass
  - Integrated ticketing
- Boarding (transport)
  - Boarding pass
- Conductor (rail)
- Subsidy
- Public transport security
  - Transit police
- Sustainable transport
- Public transport planning
- Transport-oriented development

== Public transport organizations ==
- Urban transit advocacy organizations
- Transit watchdog
- Bus Riders Union (Los Angeles)
- Bus Riders Union (Vancouver)
- Campaign for Better Transport (New Zealand)
- Global Alliance for EcoMobility
- Institute for Transportation and Development Policy
- International Association of Public Transport
- Straphangers Campaign
- T Rider's Union
- Transport Action Canada
- Tri-State Transportation Campaign
- TRU Winnipeg
- TTCriders

== Persons influential in public transport ==
- Harry Beck (4 June 1902 - 18 September 1974), was the creator of the topological London Underground map that has been emulated for many railway and metro maps around the world.
- Richard Trevithick (13 April 1771 - 22 April 1833), was the engineer who built the first railway steam locomotive that was demonstrated at Penydarren ironworks in South Wales on 21 February 1804. The steam locomotive went on to reduce travel times between towns and cities and was one of the key inventions of the Industrial Revolution.
- George Bradshaw (29 July 1800 - 6 September 1853), was the producer of the first compilation of railway timetables in Bradshaw's Guide in 1839.
- John Stephenson (1809 -1893), was the inventor of the first streetcar (named "John Mason") to run on rails in the USA. It was pulled by horses and opened on the 26 November 1832.
- Robert Davidson (1804 - 1894), was a Scottish inventor and builder of the first known electric locomotive. Named Galvani, it was tested on the Edinburgh and Glasgow Railway in September 1842 and had a top speed of 4 mph.
- Werner von Siemens (13 December 1816 - 6 December 1892), was the father of the trolleybus and the creator of the world's first electric tram line, the Gross-Lichterfelde Tramway.
- Hideo Shima (20 May 1901 - 18 March 1998), was the engineer of the Shinkansen bullet train.

== See also ==
- List of metro systems
- List of tram and light rail transit systems
