= List of urban transit advocacy organisations =

The following list of urban transit advocacy organisations indicates citizen-based interest groups which focus on urban transit service in their respective cities.

== Canada ==
- Montreal: Transport 2000
- Toronto: TTCriders
- Toronto: CodeRedTO
- Vancouver: Bus Riders Union
- Vancouver: Movement: Metro Vancouver Transit Riders
- Winnipeg: Functional Transit Winnipeg
- Winnipeg: TRU Winnipeg [Defunct]

== New Zealand ==
- Auckland: Campaign for Better Transport

== United States ==
- Light rail: Light Rail Now
- Atlanta: Citizens for Progressive Transit
- Atlanta: MARTA Army
- Baltimore: Central Maryland Transportation Alliance
- Boston: T Rider's Union
- Boston: TransitMatters
- Buffalo: Citizens Regional Transit Corporation
- Chicago: Active Transportation Alliance
- Chicago: Commuters Take Action
- Cincinnati: Better Bus Coalition
- Cleveland: Clevelanders for Public Transit
- Colorado Springs: Be United Servants
- Columbus, Ohio: Transit Columbus
- Detroit: Motor City Freedom Riders
- Houston: LINK Houston
- Iowa City: Community Transportation Committee
- Los Angeles: Bus Riders Union
- Massachusetts: Transportation for Massachusetts
- Miami: Transit Alliance Miami
- Miami: Miami Riders Alliance
- Milwaukee: Transit Riders Union
- New Orleans: Ride New Orleans (formerly Transport for NOLA)
- New York metropolitan area: Passengers United
- New York City: Effective Transit Alliance
- New York City: Riders Alliance
- New York City: TransitCenter
- New York City: Straphangers Campaign
- New York City: Transportation Alternatives
- New York City: Tri-State Transportation Campaign
- New York metropolitan area: Empire State Transportation Alliance
- Oakland, California: East Bay Transit Riders Union
- Orlando: Central Floridians for Public Transit
- Philadelphia, Pennsylvania: Transit Forward Philadelphia, Philly Transit Riders Union, 5th Square
- Pittsburgh, Pennsylvania: Pittsburghers for Public Transit
- Providence, Rhode Island: RI Transit Riders
- San Diego, California: Circulate San Diego
- San Francisco: San Francisco Transit Riders
- San Francisco Bay Area, California: Seamless Bay Area
- Seattle: Transportation Choices Coalition
- Seattle: Transit Riders Union
- Utah: Utah Transit Riders Union
- Washington, DC: Greater Greater Washington
- Wisconsin: 1000 Friends of Wisconsin

== United Kingdom ==
- Campaign for Better Transport (United Kingdom)
- Light Rail Transit Association

== See also ==
- Transit watchdog
