= Transport 2000 =

Transport 2000 may refer to:

- Transport 2000 Canada, or
- the former name of the Campaign for Better Transport (United Kingdom), a transport advocacy organisation in the U.K.
