= TSTC =

TSTC may mean:

- Texas State Technical College System
- Tri-State Transportation Campaign
- TSTC Waco Airport
