= Toronto Transit Commission fares =

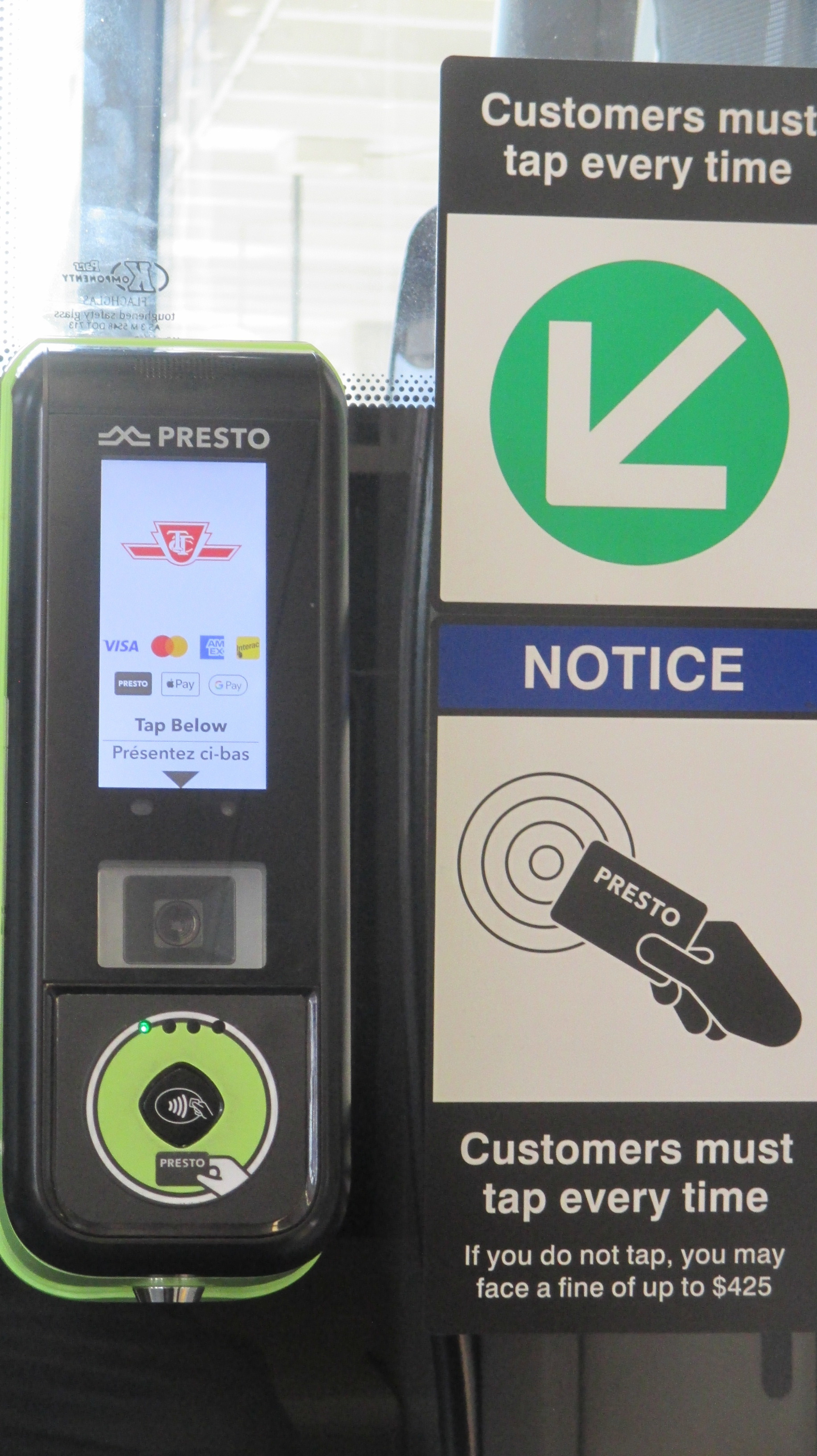
Presto reader on a Flexity Outlook streetcar in 2023, with a notice to tap each time when boarding to deter fare evasion

Fares to use the Toronto Transit Commission (TTC) transit system in Toronto, Ontario, Canada, can be paid using various media. Fare prices vary according to age (concessions for seniors aged 65 and over, youth aged 13 to 19, and free fares for children aged 12 and under), occupation (discounts for post-secondary students), income level, and health condition of riders (Fair Pass program).

To pay fares on the TTC, riders tap Presto fare media on card readers, which deducts a fare or validates transfers. Fare media includes Presto cards (multiple-use, stored-value, electronic fare cards), Presto tickets (single-use, electronic paper tickets) and open payment with contactless credit or debit cards. Cash fares are also accepted.

== Fares ==
All Presto card and contactless credit and debit card fare payments on the TTC for single-ride use as well as customers using one-ride or two-ride Presto tickets are valid for two hours from the first tap-in when one boards any TTC street vehicles or enters the paid zones in the TTC subway stations.

These are the fares as of 15 August 2026:

Fare type	Adult	Youth 13–19	Senior 65+	Post-secondary student	Fair Pass
Cash fare	$3.35	$2.40	$2.30	$3.35	$3.35
Debit/credit card	$3.30	$3.30	$3.30	$3.30	$3.30
Presto card	$3.30	$2.35	$2.25	$3.30	$2.10

Fare payment option	Cost
Presto one-ride ticket	$3.35
Presto two-ride ticket	$6.70
Presto day pass	$13.50

TTC post-secondary student monthly passes and adult 12-month passes are available only on the Presto card. All the prices below are per month, with monthly subscription prices listed for the adult 12-month passes:

Fare type	Monthly pass	12-month pass
Adult	N/A	$143.00
Youth (13–19) or senior (65+)	N/A	N/A
Post-secondary student	$128.15	N/A
Fair Pass transit discount program	N/A	N/A

Under the TTC monthly fare capping system, beginning on 1 September 2026, if a rider using the same Presto card or contactless credit or debit card pays for 47 rides in a calendar month, then all subsequent rides will be free for the remainder of that calendar month. The exception is for those who have a post-secondary student pass or adult 12-month pass.

=== Concessionary fares ===
In addition to the regular fare that must be paid by adults (age 20–64), there are concessionary fares, some based on the rider's age.

- Children aged 12 and under can travel fare free on the TTC. While children in this age group can travel fare-free on the subway and on TTC surface vehicles operating within Toronto city limits, as well as those travelling to or from Mississauga using the 52B/D Lawrence West or 900 Airport Express routes, children aged 6 to 12 must pay the appropriate York Region Transit (YRT) child fare for TTC bus routes operating in York Region (north of Steeles Avenue) as per YRT's fare policy or MiWay. Fares for children on the TTC overall were eliminated on 1 March 2015 as part of a general TTC fare price change.
- Youth fares are available to those aged 13 to 19, who are required to provide ID upon request.
- Senior fares are available to those aged 65 or older, who are required to provide ID upon request.

There are two other concessionary fares that are not age-based. Both are implemented on the Presto card:

- The Fair Pass program is for Toronto residents who are low-income earners benefiting from any of the Ontario Disability Support Program (ODSP), Ontario Works, or a Toronto Child Care Fee Subsidy. Those eligible for the Fair Pass program receive a Presto card configured for the reduced Fair Pass price for single rides which count towards the TTC monthly fare cap; Fair Pass users must renew their card annually to continue receiving discounted fares, though since the COVID-19 pandemic, the renewal became automatic.
- Post-secondary students enrolled at a post-secondary institution recognized by the TTC are eligible for a discounted monthly pass. Individuals travelling on such a pass must provide their TTC post-secondary photo ID upon request.

In 2019, the TTC revised its description of "youth" and "student" for the purpose of fare pricing. Until early 2019, the TTC described a person aged 13–19 as a "student". By mid-2019, the TTC described such a person as a "youth" and used the word "student" in the context of a post-secondary student, who could be older than 19.

=== Presto ===
The TTC supports three types of Presto fare media: the Presto card, Presto ticket and open payment methods by contactless credit and debit cards. All of these process fares and transfers when Presto media is tapped on readers, which are located on buses, on streetcars, and at subway entrances.

The TTC pays Metrolinx a 5.25-percent commission on fare revenue from Presto use. The TTC estimates the total commission paid for 2019 to be $50 million. The Presto contract between the TTC and Metrolinx went into effect in 2012 and expires in 2027, after which the TTC is free to switch to another fare system. The TTC adopted Presto in 2012 due to provincial pressure, including the threat of reduced provincial funding to the TTC.

==== Presto card ====
Presto card

The Presto card is a stored-value smartcard that can be used on the TTC, along with GO Transit, Union Pearson Express and eight other transit service providers across the Greater Toronto and Hamilton Area as well as on OC Transpo in Ottawa (similar to the Opus card used in the Greater Montreal area and Quebec City and the Compass Card used in the Metro Vancouver area).

Using the Presto card on the TTC, a cardholder can pay adult single fares by default with the option of lower concessionary fares for senior, Fair Pass, post-secondary student, youth, or child riders. (Even though children ride free, a child Presto card allows the child to pass through the fare gates at unstaffed subway station entrances.)

Post-secondary students can load a TTC monthly pass on their Presto card that provides unlimited travel across the TTC network for the corresponding month selected. The 12-month pass is a commitment by an adult Presto cardholder to purchase 12 consecutive monthly passes, and receive a discounted monthly price for each pass. Presto cardholders can add a monthly pass to their Presto card during the last twelve days of the previous month and the first eight days of the new month.

When using a Presto card to pay a single fare, a two-hour transfer is automatically recorded. From the time of initial tap-on, the transfer is valid for two hours, during which passengers can enter and exit TTC vehicles or subway stations and change direction of travel repeatedly without having to pay any additional fare.

==== Presto ticket ====
A Presto ticket is a limited-use, reinforced paper ticket with an embedded electronic chip. Like the Presto card, users must tap the Presto ticket when entering a TTC bus, streetcar or subway station. Unlike the Presto card, they do not support concessionary fares; it is valid only for TTC services. Unused Presto tickets expire 90 days from the day of purchase, except for tickets purchased in bulk by non-profit organizations for free distribution to their clients, which are valid for five years from purchase. It is still possible to exchange an expired ticket, if unused, for a valid one up to one year past the printed expiration date.

Presto tickets are accepted at all TTC subway stations, including those outside city limits. However, on surface routes, Presto tickets can only be used within the City of Toronto's limits (including both sides of Steeles Avenue itself) and at Toronto Pearson International Airport, Viscount station and Renforth station in Mississauga. On TTC-operated bus routes that travel into Mississauga (west of Pearson Airport) or York Region (north of Steeles Avenue), where an additional MiWay or York Region Transit (YRT) fare, respectively, is required, they cannot be used.

There are three types of Presto ticket: 1-ride, 2-ride and day pass. Like Presto cards, there is a two-hour transfer window available for 1- and 2-ride Presto tickets. The TTC Presto day pass expires at 2:59 a.m. on the calendar day following the ticket's first use.

==== Contactless payments by credit or debit card ====
Since 15 August 2023, customers are also able to pay single-ride TTC fares by contactless credit and debit cards or mobile wallet by tapping these items on Presto fare readers. The charge is the same price as the adult Presto card TTC fare rates and two-hour transfers are also included in the cost of the fare. This method does not support concessionary fares for seniors, youths, and those eligible for the Fair Pass program.

=== Convention pass ===
The convention pass is available only to those attending certain conventions, trade shows, and similar conferences; it is not sold to the general public. The TTC issues these passes for the applicable number of days and sells them to convention operators.

== Presto procedures ==
=== Purchasing Presto media ===
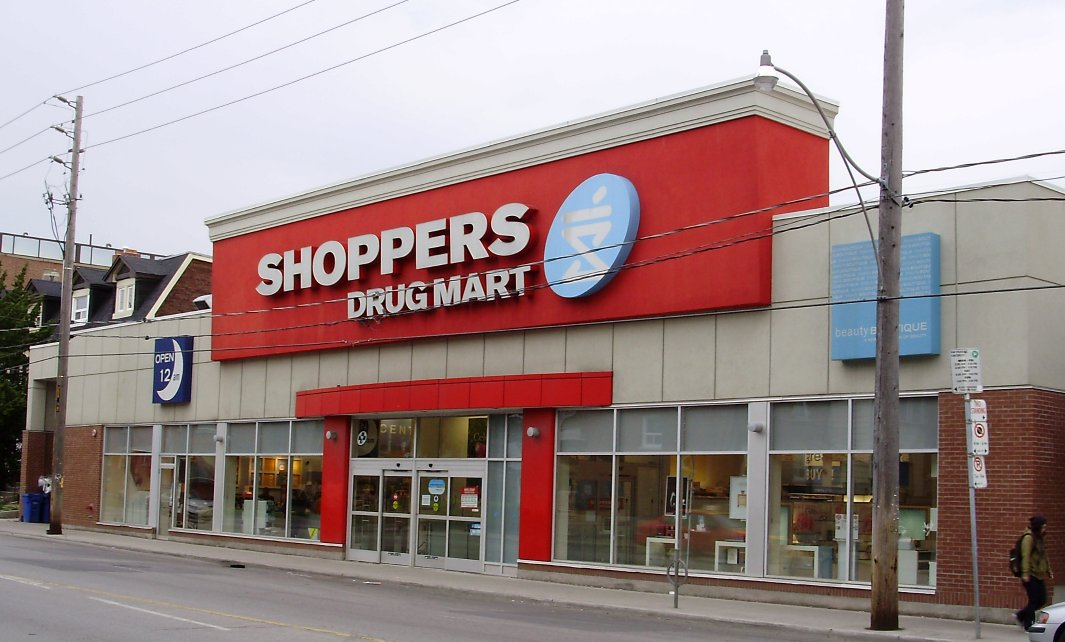
Most Shoppers Drug Mart stores in Toronto, such as this one located just to the west of Dupont station, sell Presto fare media, as do select Loblaws and No Frills locations.

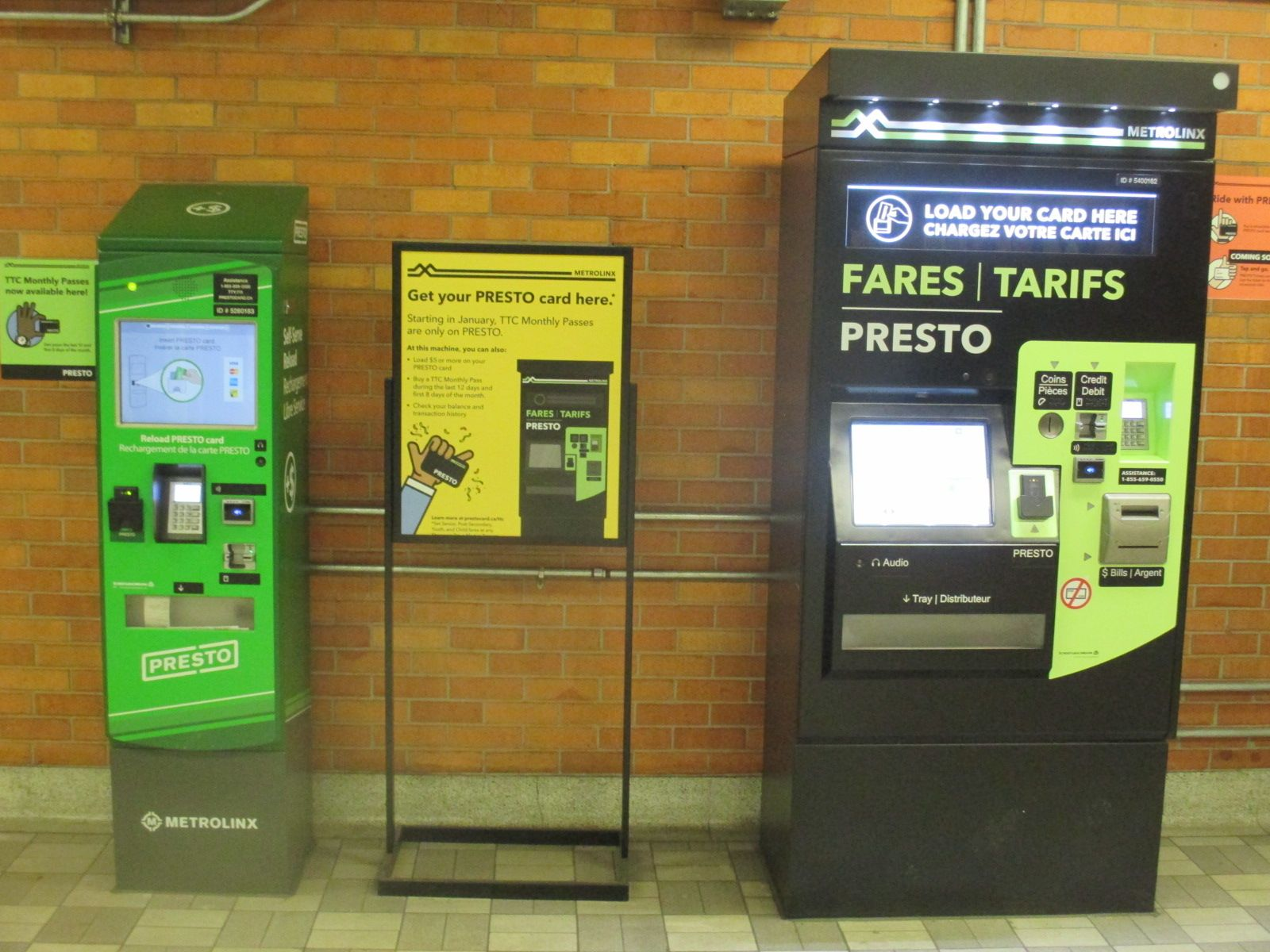
The Presto vending machine on the right sells Presto cards and tickets. Both machines can also upload funds to a Presto card.

Presto cards can be purchased, or loaded with a balance, by the following means:

- Online from the Presto website (if the Presto customer has previously created a "My PRESTO account")
- Through the Presto mobile app (if the Presto customer has previously created a "My PRESTO account")
- Presto vending machines in TTC subway stations, as well as at GO Transit and Union Pearson Express railway stations
- At most Shoppers Drug Mart across the GTHA and select Loblaws and No Frills stores within Toronto city limits

Presto cards purchased from the Presto website or from Presto vending machines are set to the adult fare rates by default. For concessionary fares (excluding the Fair Pass program), a Presto cardholder must take their Presto card to either a Shoppers Drug Mart, Loblaws store or staffed GO Transit and Union Pearson Express railway stations to have the concession fare rate set. In the case of those eligible for the Fair Pass program, ODSP or Ontario Works case workers can grant approval of the discount for their clients.

Presto tickets are sold at Presto vending machines at all TTC stations. They are also sold at most Toronto Shoppers Drug Mart stores as well as select Loblaws and No Frills stores. A customer can purchase up to ten Presto tickets at a time from a Presto vending machine at TTC stations. Presto tickets must be used within 90 days of purchase, though some print the date of expiry and some do not.

Presto vending machines are also available at Toronto Pearson International Airport at each of Terminals 1 and 3, ground transportation level for both. These sell both Presto cards and Presto tickets.

TTC post-secondary student monthly passes can be loaded onto a Presto card online or at a participating retailer (most Shoppers Drug Mart stores and select Loblaws or No Frills stores in the Toronto area) while TTC adult 12-month passes can only be purchased and loaded onto a card online.

Metrolinx granted Loblaw Companies exclusive retailing rights to sell Presto fare media (currently via participating Loblaws, No Frills and Shoppers Drug Mart stores). As of June 2019, there were 136 Shoppers Drug Mart stores in Toronto selling Presto products. Presto has a mobile app that can be downloaded through Google Play or Apple's App Store and also allow mobile devices to be used for payment using Presto.

=== Using Presto media ===
A rider paying their fare with a Presto card, Presto ticket, credit card or debit card must tap every time they board a bus (including Wheel-Trans) or streetcar, or pass through a fare gate at a subway station. All buses and streetcars have a Presto reader at each door while Line 5 and 6 surface stops have several Presto readers on the platform. Presto customers may board by any door on a streetcar. On most buses, customers can only board by the front door, unless that bus is replacing a streetcar or inside the fare-paid zone of a subway station, as well as replacing subway trains at certain stations during subway closures, both planned and unplanned.

When paying a single fare, Presto automatically records a timed transfer. From the time of initial tap-on, a transfer with Presto is valid for two hours, during which passengers can enter and exit TTC vehicles or subway stations and change direction of travel repeatedly without having to pay any additional fare. Presto users must tap every time they either enter a subway station or board a surface vehicle. However, this is optional if doing so within the fare paid zone. If the two-hour transfer expires while riding on a TTC vehicle, Presto cardholders may finish the trip on that vehicle without paying another fare or risking a fine. If the rider subsequently boards another vehicle outside the fare paid zone after expiry, then another fare needs to be paid.

Several TTC bus routes run from the City of Toronto into either York Region or Mississauga. Riders must pay a TTC fare when boarding the TTC bus in Toronto, and either a YRT or MiWay fare when boarding such a route outside of Toronto city limits. Riders paying by Presto card, credit card, or debit card must tap a second time when alighting the bus after crossing a municipal boundary to validate their transfer. With the One Fare program, a GTHA-wide fare integration program introduced on 26 February 2024, no additional fare is charged if the rider taps off within two hours, or three hours if GO Transit was used as part of the trip. This procedure does not apply to TTC routes terminating at Toronto Pearson International Airport nor Renforth station nor Viscount station nor to those passengers exiting Line 1 Yonge–University at Highway 407 and Vaughan stations.

Customers require proof-of-payment (POP) when riding on streetcars, on Line 5 Eglinton and on Line 6 Finch West. Presto media provides this proof after the customer taps it. Roving TTC employees such as fare inspectors or special constables can check a customer's Presto media status using a handheld portable reader.

The TTC and Metrolinx have yet to resolve a dispute about deliverables for the Presto system. The TTC wants Metrolinx to implement the following additional features:

- Allow Presto paper TTC tickets to be provided on streetcars and buses to replace the paper transfers issued to riders who pay by cash
- Expand the retail network selling Presto fare media

Other ideas that the TTC had considered in 2015 for the Presto card were distance-based fares and premium fares for rush-hour travel. However, a June 2019 TTC report on Presto implementation made no mention of those two ideas.

All Line 5 Eglinton and Line 6 Finch West stations have full-service Presto fare-vending machines. Riders on these lines need to pay or validate their fare on the platform before boarding. Grade-separated stations have fare gates.

=== Fare capping ===
As early as February 2022, the TTC considered replacing the Presto TTC monthly pass with a fare capping system. This would benefit some riders who are unable to buy the pass up front or who are unsure if they would make enough trips in a month to justify a monthly pass. An adult paying the regular fare would need to make 48 trips (later changed to 47 trips) in a month to justify buying a monthly pass rather than paying by single fares. The percentage of TTC customers using a monthly pass has fallen from 50 percent in 2015 to 30 percent in 2019, a major cause being that a single fare paid via Presto allows two hours of unlimited travel on the TTC. The TTC was also considering a reduction of the concession fare for seniors and youth to bring those fares in line with those charged to Fair Pass users.

On 1 September 2026, the new monthly fare capping program launched, which caps fares and allows free rides on the TTC for the rest of the corresponding month after riders have paid for 47 trips in a month using their stored balance on a physical or digital Presto card, credit card or debit card and the same payment method is used for all TTC trips in a calendar month. This replaced the upfront TTC Presto monthly pass program, with the monthly pass last being offered to the general public in August 2026; however, the adult 12-month pass and post-secondary student monthly pass remain available for purchase.

=== One Fare program ===
On 26 February 2024, the TTC began its participation with the Ontario One Fare program. This program provides free transfers for riders transferring between TTC and participating GTHA municipal transit systems using the Presto system in the 905 regions (such as Brampton Transit, Durham Region Transit, MiWay, Oakville Transit and York Region Transit) as well as fare discount for those transferring between TTC and GO Transit. The program applies to riders who pay their fares by debit, credit or Presto card, or those using Presto in Google Wallet or Apple Wallet.

Under the One Fare program:

- Riders who begin their trips on the TTC (or another participating GTHA municipal transit system) pay the regular system fare; when they transfer onto GO Transit, they receive a discount that is equal to the cost of the appropriate municipal transit system's Presto fare.
- Riders who begin their trips with GO Transit pay a regular GO fare; when they transfer onto the TTC or other participating GTHA municipal transit systems, they are not charged an additional fare. For such a trip, only the GO Transit fare is charged.
- Riders transferring between the TTC and other participating GTHA municipal transit systems can transfer without paying a second fare.
- Transfers must be completed within two hours, or three hours if GO Transit is used.
- Riders paying by cash, Presto ticket and those using the Union Pearson Express are not eligible for the free or discounted transfer.
- Riders using a Presto card loaded with a valid transit pass of a participating GTHA municipal transit system are eligible to transfer between the TTC and other participating GTHA municipal transit systems without having to pay a second fare; however, customers who begin their trips on a municipal transit system they have a pass for do not receive a discount when transferring to GO Transit.
- Only paid trips originating on the TTC count toward the monthly 47-ride TTC fare cap; once the cap is reached, all subsequent rides originating on the TTC are free for the remainder of the month. Free transfers to the TTC from other participating GTHA transit systems do not count towards the monthly TTC fare cap.

The province reimburses the participating transit operators involved in the program for lost revenue from the free or discounted transfers. As free or discounted card transfers need to be recorded for reimbursements (as well as ensuring double-fare payments are charged for riders ineligible for free transfers), regional bus terminals will remain outside the fare-paid areas of relevant subway stations, and regional buses serving fare-paid TTC terminals directly – as before the policy – still drop off passengers outside the stations. They can, however, board passengers inside these stations, with riders either tapping cards or paying the regional cash fare, as is the case for instance with Durham Region Transit at Scarborough Centre station.

=== Future ===
By July 2024, Metrolinx had committed to providing a machine-readable paper transfer (MRPT) for those who pay fares by cash on TTC surface vehicles (TTC buses, streetcars, and light rail vehicles). MRPTs would be able to open fare gates at subway stations and would also be good for two hours, though they would not be valid on other transit agencies.

== Cash fare payment procedures ==
As of January 2026, cash fares were still accepted for fare payment, but legacy TTC tickets and tokens were no longer available for purchase nor accepted as valid fare. At least one priority entrance of each subway station has a farebox staffed by a customer service agent where riders can pay with exact cash, after which the rider obtains a paper transfer from a red POP machine to act as proof of payment. On buses, riders board at the front door(s) to deposit cash into a fare box and ask the driver for a paper transfer. On Flexity Outlook streetcars and on Line 5 and Line 6 surface stops, passengers paying by cash pay their fare at the grey or silver fare and transfer machines (FTMs) and obtain a receipt as proof of payment.

=== Payment ===
==== At subway stations ====
All subway stations have at least one entrance equipped with a farebox staffed by a customer service agent where customers can deposit cash or present a valid paper TTC transfer. Children (aged 12 or under) without a Presto card can gain free access to the system through these staffed entrances.

Before the transition to Presto, TTC subway stations had two types of fare gates, metal push-bar tripod turnstiles at staffed entrances and floor-to-ceiling revolving-door turnstiles at unstaffed subway entrances, both of which allowed customers to pass through the gates by inserting a token or swiping a fare card with a magnetic strip, such as a monthly or weekly TTC pass or a GTA weekly pass. From 2016 to 2018, the TTC introduced new plexiglass paddle-style fare gates at all subway station entrances, which replaced the old tripod turnstiles used at staffed entrances and floor-to-ceiling revolving turnstiles used at unstaffed entrances. The first of these new gates were installed at Main Street station in March 2016 and they were added to all subway station entrances by June 2018, with Finch being the last station to have Presto fare gates and readers installed at its entrances. In 2019, after physical passes were discontinued, the swipe card readers were removed. Following these removals, only Presto customers can pass through unstaffed fare gates. Customers paying with cash or using paper transfers can only enter at staffed entrances.

==== On buses, streetcars, and light rail vehicles ====
On buses, cash (change not given) must be deposited into a farebox by the front door near the operator, while Presto, credit and debit card users must tap their card at the door to pay fares or validate transfers.

On streetcars and Line 5 Eglinton and Line 6 Finch West LRVs, the operator is situated inside a separated cab and does not monitor fare payments. Fare payment procedures are as follows:

- For streetcars, Presto, credit or debit card users must tap on the Presto device at the door while Line 5 and Line 6 riders must tap on the Presto device on the platform (for on-street stops) or at the fare gates (for fully grade-separated stations) to pay their fares or validate transfers.
- The fare and transfer machines located onboard streetcars and on Line 5 and Line 6 surface stop platforms dispense a paper proof-of-payment transfer when a fare is paid with cash. From January 2016 to December 2018, they also accepted payment by contactless credit and debit cards as well, but that functionality was removed due to reliability issues.

Customers can neither purchase Presto fare media nor load funds or a TTC transit pass onto their Presto fare media on TTC buses and streetcars.

=== Transfers ===
A transfer is a proof-of-payment receipt issued when a fare is paid by cash. It allows riders to switch between most routes without paying additional fares and can be shown as POP to TTC fare inspectors or special constables while riding onboard streetcars or Line 5 and Line 6 vehicles. (POP is mandatory when riding on streetcars and on Lines 5 and 6.) A paper transfer is valid to complete a one-way continuous trip without stopovers, with route changes allowed only at valid transfer points generally at an intersection where two routes cross. The transfer rules used to be the same for both Presto and legacy users; however, since 26 August 2018, Presto provides its users a two-hour timed transfer. Presto users do not require paper transfers as a transfer is stored electronically on their card or ticket once they perform their initial tap on a reader.

Three forms of paper transfers are used on the TTC:

- On buses, transfers are issued directly by vehicle operators. These transfers are pre-printed with the route and date and torn off from a holder that with tears in certain locations on the bottom and the side, marking it with the time of issue and direction of travel.
- At subway stations, transfers can be obtained from machines near entry points into the station after customers pay their fares and pass through the fare gates. The machines print the date, time and the name of the station where the transfer was issued, on standardized thermal paper. They were introduced in the mid-1990s and are not valid on surface vehicles at the station (if no fare-paid terminal where transfers are not required is present) at which they are issued.
- The fare and transfer machines found onboard Flexity Outlook streetcars and on Line 5 and 6 surface stops dispense paper proof-of-payment transfers using thermal paper. After a passenger pays their fares at the machine with coins, a one-ride paper POP ticket is printed out that shows the fare type, date, time, and stop where it was issued. For Flexity Outlook streetcars, it also shows the route and vehicle on which it was issued.

=== Cash fares outside Toronto ===
The TTC operates several routes – including the western branch of Line 1 Yonge–University – that cross the Toronto city limits. For riders paying by cash or Presto ticket who are not eligible under the One Fare program, an extra fare is still charged when crossing the fare boundary on TTC buses. In York Region and the City of Mississauga (where the fare boundary is set at both Pearson Airport terminals, Viscount station of the Terminal Link, and Renforth station of the Mississauga Transitway), these TTC bus routes operate under a contract agreement to those municipalities. The additional fare is equal to the cost of either the MiWay or YRT fare, and transfer privileges with connecting Brampton Transit, MiWay and YRT buses are included.

For the two Line 1 subway stations fully in Vaughan – Highway 407 and Vaughan Metropolitan Centre – no extra fare is charged to reach these stations to simplify fare collection, and these stations are part of the Toronto TTC fare zone. An additional fare is charged when transferring between the TTC subway and other transit systems, such as YRT, at these stations, as is the case when transferring to other transit systems located in or bordering Toronto. This is similar to the situation in 1968, when the subway was first extended outside Toronto's pre-1998 limits, when an internal TTC fare zone system was in place (see Zone fares (1954–1973)).

=== TTC Times Two ===
While separate fares are charged when transferring between TTC and Metrolinx-owned GO Transit or Union Pearson Express (UPX) fare-by-distance services, riders who paid an initial TTC fare with cash and obtain a paper transfer can use GO or UPX for an intermediate stage of their journey and can change back to the TTC – at designated locations only – without having to pay a second TTC fare to complete a trip; this policy is called "TTC Times Two". These restrictions do not apply when using Presto fare media.

== History ==
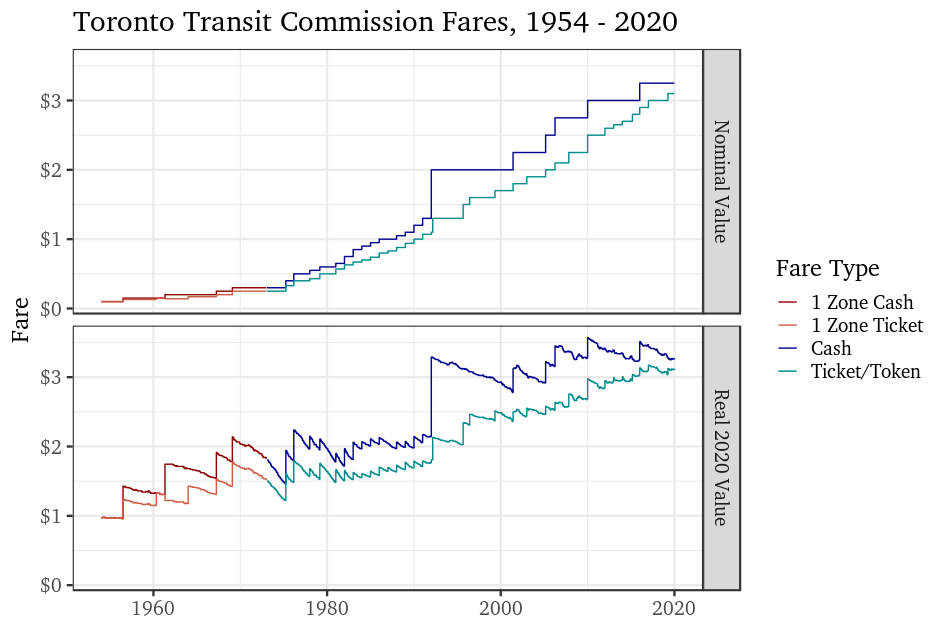
Chart of TTC fare changes over time from 1954 to 2020: the top chart showing the nominal value and the bottom chart showing the real value in 2020 dollars, showing the increase in both over time

Fares have increased substantially since the commission was formed, both in nominal and real terms. There have also been major changes to the way fares are paid for and in the schemes used to determine fares.

=== Presto fare media (2007–present) ===
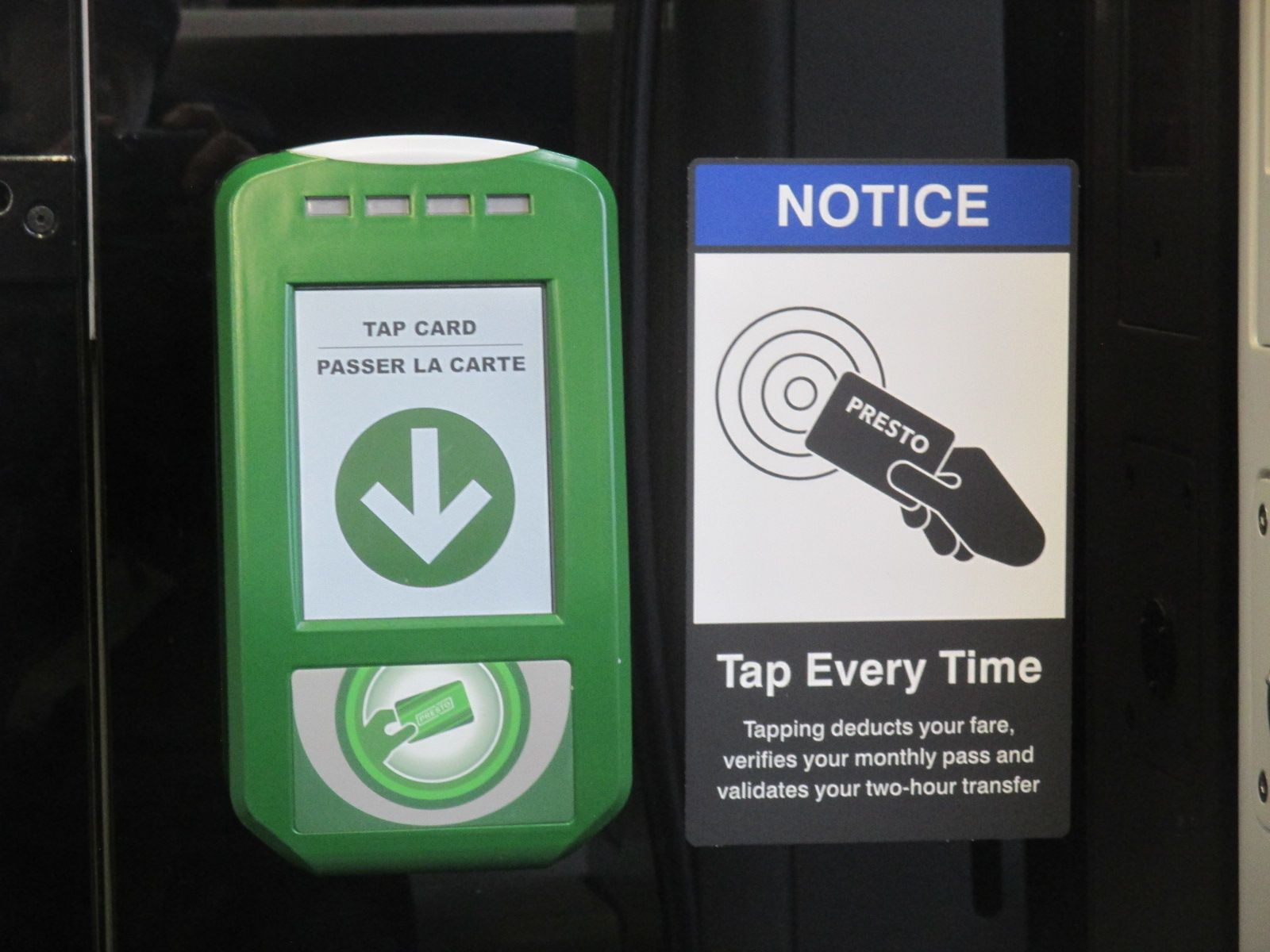
An older Presto reader, which did not support open payment, on a Flexity Outlook streetcar in 2019

In 2007, the Toronto Transit Commission (TTC) committed to implementing the Presto system at 14 of its major subway stations. In 2008, the TTC approved the use of a smartcard system and worked with Presto in addressing the TTC's business requirements for "full" system participation. An initial funding allocation of $140 million was earmarked by the provincial and federal governments and the City of Toronto; however, the TTC estimated in its 2009–2013 budget that the project would take $365 million to complete. At a provincial funding announcement in March 2011, it was announced that Presto would become the TTC's fare card of choice, though details of financing were still to be worked out.

On 28 November 2012, TTC CEO Andy Byford, TTC chair Karen Stintz, and Metrolinx signed the master agreement committing the TTC to the Presto fare payment system. The agreement fell under another master agreement that for the next ten years the new four LRT lines would be built by Metrolinx and operated by the TTC. The TTC was the last system to commit to Presto, while also being the largest system with the most users in Canada. On 30 November 2014, the Flexity Outlook streetcars became the first surface vehicles on the TTC to be equipped with this system. The older Canadian Light Rail Vehicle (CLRV) and Articulated Light Rail Vehicle (ALRV) streetcars would follow one year later on 14 December 2015, when those cars were retrofitted with Presto machines as well, and all remaining surface vehicles (including buses) and at least one entrance of all subway stations were equipped with this system by 23 December 2016.

In April 2016, Main Street was the first station on the subway system to have the new paddle-door fare gates, which replaced the old tripod turnstiles, installed. All subway stations (at least one entrance per station) became fully Presto-compatible by 22 December 2016.

From May to December 2016, Presto readers were installed in TTC buses from west to east by division. By 31 May 2016, all Queensway division buses were equipped with Presto readers. This was followed by Wilson and Arrow Road divisions in August 2016 and Malvern and Mount Dennis divisions in October 2016. Birchmount and Eglinton divisions were the last two divisions to have the readers rolled out, with installations completed by 23 December 2016.

By September 2016, frequent reports emerged that Presto loading machines, fare gates, and the units for tapping cards were not functioning as initially expected. The prevalence of these outages had the TTC calling the situation "unacceptable", although Byford noted the situation was improving. Across 2016 and 2017, faulty Presto devices resulted in 1.4 million free rides on the TTC, each ride representing forgone revenue for the Commission. The TTC estimated that from January 2016 to February 2018, it had lost $4.2 million in fare revenue as a result of problems with Presto readers, for which—as per the master agreement of 2012—Metrolinx was obligated to reimburse the TTC.

In June 2017, the TTC made their monthly Metropasses available on the Presto card; initially, only the adult and senior versions were available; by the fourth quarter of 2018, student, youth, post-secondary student, and 12-month discount Metropasses were available to load to Presto cards.

On 7 January 2018, the TTC and Metrolinx introduced a discounted double co-fare for customers transferring between Union Pearson Express, GO Transit and the TTC. The discounted fare was only available to Presto card customers who paid single fares using a stored card balance and was not available to customers who paid by cash, paper tickets, tokens or a Presto card with a digital monthly TTC pass loaded on it. This program was cancelled on 1 April 2020, after the Ontario provincial government was unable to renew the contract to extend the double-fare discount program.

Starting in April 2018, the City of Toronto implemented its Fair Pass program for eligible low-income residents as part of the City's poverty reduction policies. The program was implemented through the Presto card, and offered $1 off single rides or $30.75 off a monthly pass relative to adult rates at the time of implementation.

On 26 August 2018, Presto users were given a two-hour, time-based transfer when paying a single fare. This feature was not granted to those who carry paper transfers.

By the end of December 2018, Presto readers were available on all streetcars and TTC buses as well in all subway station entrances (including both the main/staffed and unstaffed/automated entrances). Coxwell on Line 2 was the last subway station to be equipped with readers.

In late 2018, the TTC began internal testing of single-use paper Presto fare cards, called Presto tickets (which include one-ride, two-ride and day pass tickets), to replace legacy tickets and tokens. They were officially made available to the public at Lawrence West and Yorkdale stations on 6 April 2019, and were later made available at all Line 1 subway stations between Lawrence West and Vaughan Metropolitan Centre on 3 May 2019. On 8 July 2019, they were made available in all subway stations. They are also available for sale at select Shoppers Drug Mart stores in Toronto.

Starting 1 January 2019, Wheel-Trans customers using a Wheel-Trans sedan taxi could pay their fare using a TTC monthly pass on a Presto card. Otherwise, customers without a monthly pass had to pay the fare by cash, concession tickets or tokens.

In June 2019, the TTC sent Metrolinx an invoice for $7.5 million to recover revenue lost due to faulty Presto readers. Metrolinx refused to pay the invoice, because—in their view—it was "not valid", and Metrolinx had borne most of the costs of Presto implementation.

Effective 29 July 2019, riders can use a Presto card to pay both the TTC and MiWay fares for TTC buses crossing into Mississauga past Pearson Airport, and effective 26 August 2019, a Presto card can pay both the TTC and York Region Transit fares for TTC bus routes operating between Toronto and York Region.

Effective 26 August 2019, riders can use the Presto card to pay the full double fare on Downtown Express bus routes (141–145). Presto cardholders also have the option of loading either a monthly or 12-month Downtown Express pass onto their Presto card. These two passes replace the previously available Downtown Express sticker that one could purchase and affix to a Presto card.

Starting 13 January 2020, Wheel-Trans customers using a Wheel-Trans sedan taxi can pay the fare from the stored value on a Presto Card or by using a Presto ticket.

In February 2020, the TTC audit committee estimated that fraudulent use of the child Presto card accounted for 33.7 percent of all fare evasion and that 90 percent of taps using a child Presto card were fraudulently made by riders over 12 years of age. Children 12 and under ride free, and the child Presto card is to allow a child to pass through the fare gates at a subway entrance. Fare evasion using a child Presto card results in an estimated $23-million annual loss in revenue. Demand for child Presto cards grew by 75 percent in 2019 while demand for other concessions on a Presto card grew by only 25 percent. In September and October 2021, Presto readers were upgraded so that if a child card is used, the reader sounds a three-toned chime and flashes a yellow light.

In April 2021, the Ontario Human Rights Commission (OHRC) urged Metrolinx and the TTC to provide more locations in poorer, racialized neighbourhoods for Presto fare purchases. Away from subway stations, there are often few Shoppers Drug Mart outlets in such neighbourhoods, largely in North York, Scarborough and Etobicoke. For example, in the York South–Weston riding, with the transition from legacy to Presto fare media, the number of fare outlets dropped from 37 legacy fare vendors to 2 Shoppers Drug Mart outlets for Presto fares. Shoppers Drug Mart has an exclusive contract for third-party Presto sales. Many riders also lack internet access for online purchases, and riders with mobility problems are inconvenienced.

By 25 September 2021, Presto readers on TTC surface vehicles had their screen formats updated to provide customers with more information, such as the amount of fare paid, the remaining balance, the transfer expiry time, or whether a monthly or an all-day ride pass was used. If a Presto card or ticket is declined, the screen displays the reason. If a child card is used, the reader sounds a three-toned chime. If a Fair Pass card is used, the reader sounds one beep instead of the previous two. Similar upgrades to the readers at subway station fare gates took place on 4 October 2021.

Between September 2022 and June 2023, Metrolinx and the TTC upgraded their readers on Wheel-Trans vehicles, buses, streetcars and subway station fare gates in order to support open payment using credit and debit cards and mobile wallets, a feature that was launched across the TTC network on 15 August 2023.

On 26 February 2024, the TTC joined the province's One Fare Program, a fare integration program that enables free or discounted transfers between TTC, GO Transit, and other Presto-enabled local municipal transit agencies in the 905 regions for customers using Presto cards or contactless credit and debit cards.

On 1 September 2026, the TTC replaced most of their standard upfront monthly passes with an automatic monthly fare capping system with the cap initially set to 47 fares per calendar month for customers using a Presto card, credit card or debit card; once the cap is reached, all subsequent rides on the TTC are free for the remainder of the month. Adult 12-month passes and post-secondary student monthly passes remain available for purchase.

=== Fare arrangements ===
==== Proof of payment (1990–present) ====
POP was introduced on the Queen streetcar lines in 1990 to make better use of the Articulated Light Rail Vehicles on the line. Prior to August 2014, the POP system was limited to the Queen routes because they do not enter the fare-paid terminal of any of the system's subway stations due to concerns of further fare evasion. POP is incompatible with the paperless transfer system used by the rail system. The POP system was extended to the 510 Spadina route on 31 August 2014 coinciding with the introduction on that day of new Flexity Outlook streetcars; this is because operators on these vehicles are in a closed cab and are not responsible for fare collection and do not normally issue paper POP transfers. The 504 King followed on 1 January 2015, and the 509 Harbourfront route also became POP on 29 March 2015 when the Flexity streetcars were added on that line. Since mid-2015, route 511 Bathurst had operated occasionally on a POP system during special events, such as the 2015 Pan American Games and the annual Canadian National Exhibition, when the Flexity Outlook streetcars are used on that line.

Since 14 December 2015, all TTC streetcar lines, including streetcar replacement shuttle buses, have operated on a proof-of-payment system at all times, in which case fare payments are treated on an honour system and passengers must carry proof that they have paid the correct fares to show during random spot checks (which can take place onboard a vehicle or at subway stations served by streetcar routes). Passengers with POP can board at any door of the vehicle. Forms of POP include a paper POP (which also serves as a transfer receipt); a validated TTC senior, student, or youth ticket; or a tapped-in Presto, credit or debit card.

Upon request, passengers must present POP. TTC staff such as fare inspectors or special constables who conduct random fare inspections also carry handheld verification machines which give them the ability to verify valid fare payments made by Presto, credit or debit card and check transaction history. A summons, such as a fine, can be issued if passengers fail to produce POP upon request.

==== Presto time-based transfers (2017–present) ====
In November 2017, a Toronto transit advocacy group, TTCriders, along with Toronto mayor John Tory and two Toronto city councillors including TTC chair Josh Colle, made a request to the TTC to introduce system-wide two-hour time-based transfers across the entire TTC network (a system that is already in place on other local Greater Toronto and Hamilton Area transit agencies). The new system officially debuted on 26 August 2018, following the TTC's board of directors approval on 28 November 2017. The TTC estimates that the program will add five million trips to the system, at a cost of $20.9 million annually, as this incentive will allow for unlimited travel – including the ability to enter and exit any TTC vehicles and stations, along with changing their direction of travel – within two hours from initial tap-on without having to pay another fare.

The two-hour time-based transfer is only available to Presto, credit and debit card users. Paper transfers are only valid for a continuous one-way trip with no stopovers or backtracking permitted.

=== Former fare media ===
==== Legacy tickets (1921–2025) ====
The TTC discontinued sales of senior and youth tickets in 2019, but they remained valid for use until 1 June 2025.

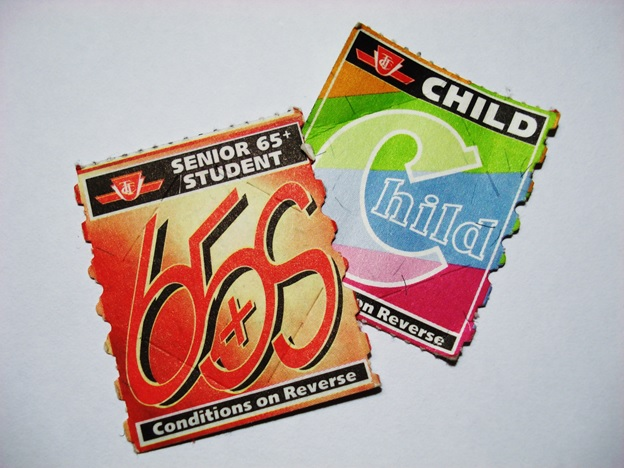
TTC senior, student and child tickets from 2009

The TTC has used paper tickets since its founding as the Toronto Transportation Commission in 1921. The first tickets sold in sets of 4 for 25 cents for adults and 10 for 25 cents for children. Whether a rider was eligible for the adult or child fare was determined by height as measured against a mark on a pole at the entrance of a streetcar or bus. Initially, anyone over 130 centimetres (51 in) had to pay the adult fare. However, as children became taller on average in later years, the mark was raised to 136 cm (53.5 in) in 1942, 140 cm (56 in) in 1960 and 150 cm (58 in) in 1972. By 1973, taller children could use the child fare if they had proof of age.

Adult tickets were issued until 29 September 2008, when they were withdrawn due to counterfeiting. Adult tickets were temporarily reissued between 23 November 2009 and 31 January 2010 to alleviate demand on tokens in the lead-up to a fare hike that also withdrew all older tickets and passes.

Since 1 March 2015, children age 12 and under have been able to ride fare-free on the TTC. Thus, children's tickets were discontinued effective that date. Children's tickets were sold in multiples of ten.

As with tokens, the TTC discontinued the sale of legacy tickets at subway stations effective 1 December 2019 in favour of Presto fare media. Some third-party retailers continued to sell legacy tickets until the end of March 2023. However, outstanding tickets are still valid fare media until 1 June 2025 or 31 December 2025 for Wheel-Trans customers.

==== Tokens (1954–2025) ====
The TTC discontinued sales of tokens in 2019 but outstanding tokens remained valid for use until 1 June 2025.

All TTC tokens have been the same diameter, slightly smaller than a Canadian dime. The tokens used prior to 1954 were brass coins. In 1954, the year the city's first subway opened, these were replaced by lightweight aluminum tokens produced by the Royal Canadian Mint. The new tokens were simply designed with the word "SUBWAY" prominently displayed on both sides.

The TTC preferred riders to use tokens instead of tickets because turnstiles activated by tokens were efficient in allowing access into the station. However, tokens were unpopular with riders because they got mixed in with loose change and many riders continued to use tickets. To address this problem, cardboard holders containing seven tokens were introduced in 1962. Token sales doubled. Honest Ed's, a former independent retailer, offered a plastic holder with its logo on it.

By 1966, a new brass token was introduced for single-token sales. The brass token used a more elaborate design displaying the TTC crest on the obverse and the TTC logo on the reverse.

The extension of the Bloor–Danforth subway into the boroughs of Etobicoke and Scarborough was commemorated by special brass tokens in 1968. These remained in circulation for a limited time.

New aluminum tokens were introduced in 1975 using the design of the 1966 brass tokens. The 1954 and 1975 tokens remained in circulation until February 2007, when the remaining 30 million were withdrawn due to increased counterfeiting.

The replacement for the 1954 and 1975 tokens was a bi-metal design, which was phased in starting in November 2006. It replaced the old tokens completely in February 2007.

The 2006 tokens were heavier and more resistant to counterfeiting. 20 million tokens were ordered in 2006. 20 million additional tokens were purchased from Osborne Coinage Company in 2008 for US$2 million; these tokens were used to replace adult tickets then in circulation.

Counterfeits of the 2006 tokens were discovered in 2010. The counterfeits had the correct mass and dimensions, but had subtle typographic errors and lacked the expensive nickel used in real tokens for durability. The counterfeits did not work in automated turnstiles but could pass undetected by a human collector.

The TTC discontinued the sale of tokens at subway stations effective 1 December 2019 in favour of Presto fare media. Some third-party retailers continued to sell tokens until the end of March 2023. However, outstanding tokens are still valid fare media until 1 June 2025 or until 31 December 2025 for Wheel-Trans customers.

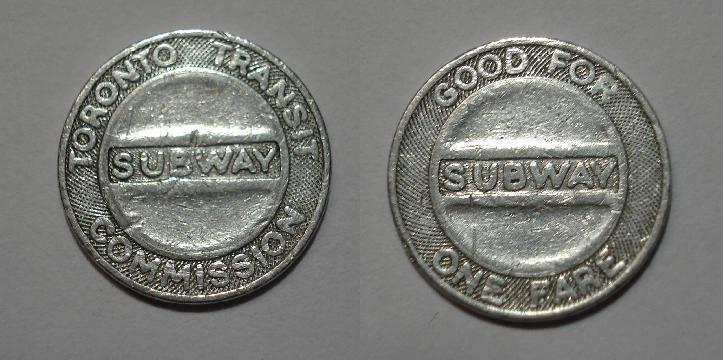
1954 token

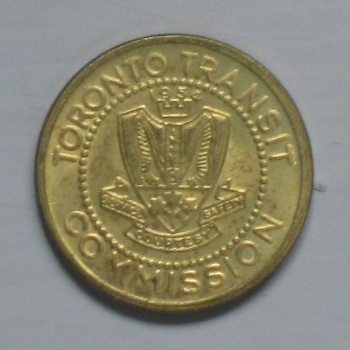
c. 1966 brass token

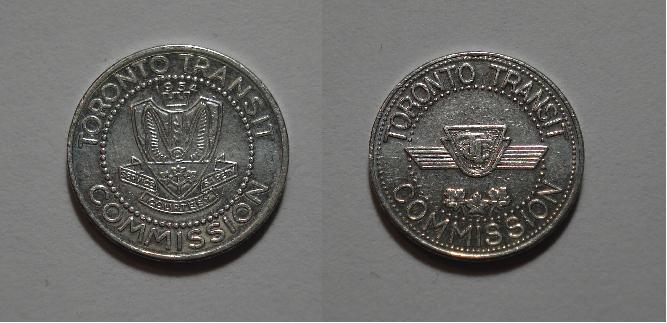
1975 token

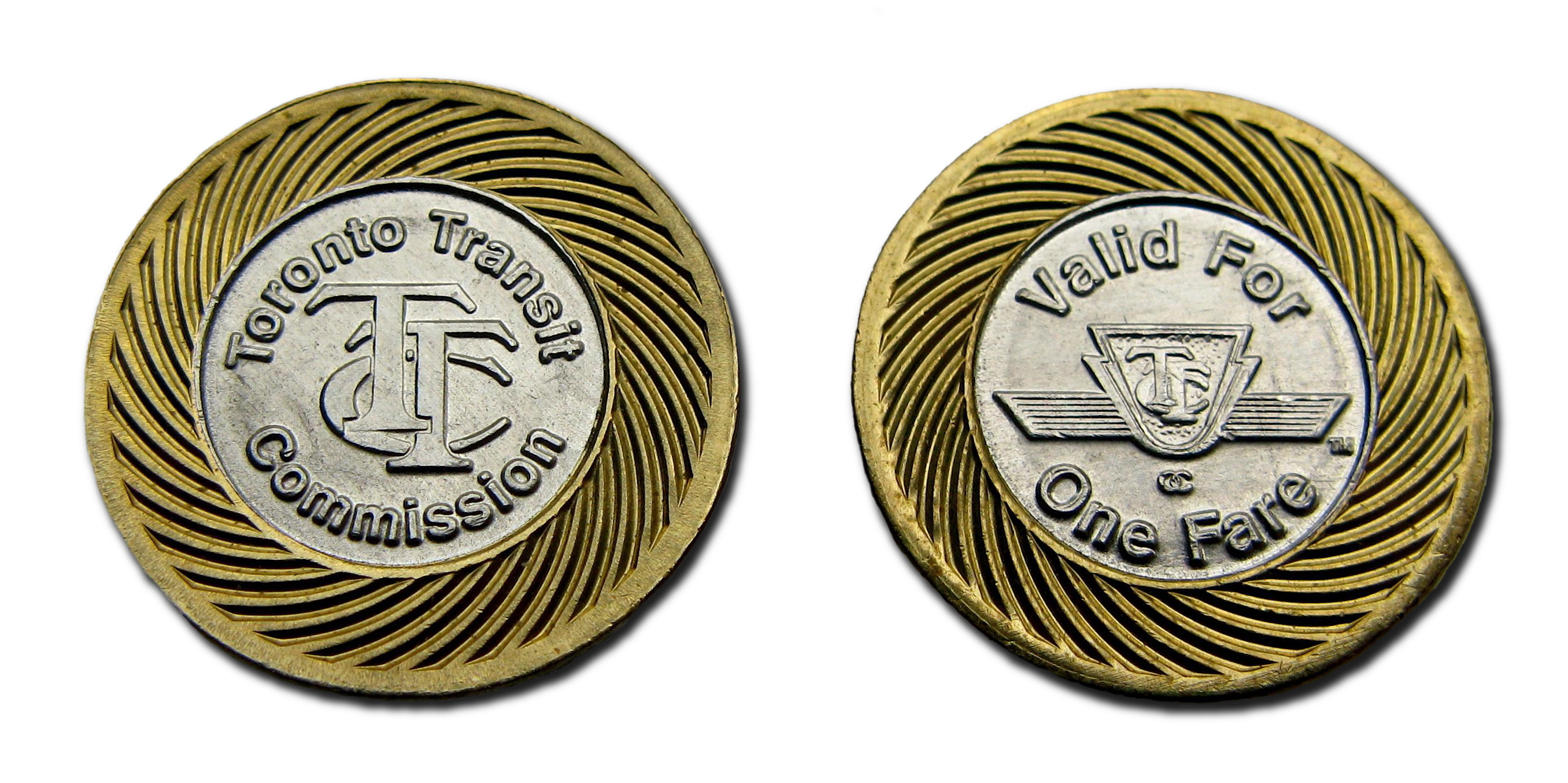
2006 token

==== Day pass (1973–2025) ====
In 2019, the TTC discontinued sales of the legacy day pass (not to be confused with the TTC Presto day pass), but such passes remained valid for use until 1 June 2025.

The first pass regularly offered on the TTC was the "Sunday or Holiday Pass", introduced in 1973. It allowed group travel on Sundays and holidays, similar to the later day pass. However, because the TTC was always heavily used on the last day of the annual Canadian National Exhibition, the pass was not offered on Labour Day.

In 1990, the Sunday or holiday pass was replaced by the day pass. It remained valid on Sundays and holidays for groups, but was extended to weekdays and Saturdays as a single-person pass. On weekdays, it was not valid until the end of the morning rush hour at 9:30 a.m.

Around 1994, the TTC began announcing specific periods around Christmas, and sometimes other holidays, when the day pass would be accepted as a group pass on any day. Starting around 2002, they also offered transferable weekly passes during certain weeks.

In 2005, with a political climate including the prospect of subsidies tied to ridership, the TTC became more willing to promote pass usage even at the loss of other fares. In March, the TTC extended the day pass to be usable by groups on Saturdays. Later in September, the TTC made the Metropass transferable and introduced the transferable weekly pass.

Existing legacy day passes were valid until 1 June 2025 or 31 December 2025 for Wheel-Trans customers.

==== Metropass (1980–2018) ====
The TTC has always been cautious about the loss of revenue from selling passes to riders who would otherwise make the same trips and pay more. Passes have been introduced gradually and have always been relatively expensive compared to some other transit systems: for example, in the fares adopted in 2014, an adult Metropass must be used for 50 trips in a month or else tokens would be cheaper.

The TTC introduced the Metropass in 1980. At that time, there was only one price, based on the adult fare. The pass was not transferable and had to be used with TTC-issued photo ID cards (in about 2000, the TTC also began accepting Ontario driver's licences as ID). A lower-price Metropass for seniors was added in 1984, and for students in 1991 (originally at a slightly higher rate than seniors). The magnetic strip was added to the pass in 1990, allowing it to operate automatic turnstiles, even though this meant that the user's ID would then not normally be checked.

To combat fraud and sharing the pass amongst riders, a printable box was placed on the right-hand side of the card. To make the pass valid for the month, the commuter hand-printed the digits of either the commuter's Metropass photo ID card, if the commuter had one, or the commuter's initials and abbreviated gender if the commuter used other ID. The holder of the pass was also required to show the commuter's Metropass photo ID card or another piece of Government of Ontario-issued identification at the same time that the holder presented their pass.

From 1992 to 2009, free parking for Metropass users was provided at certain subway-station parking lots. Some lots were restricted to Metropass users.

In February 1993, the Metropass became the same size as a credit card and could be swiped at subway stations. The new design was a simple mono-coloured and two-shaded design, with the abbreviation of the month in a large font, and the year placed beneath it in the same typeface and colour. The background of the card's front had a shaded design to enable the holder to distinguish the text on the card.

At about the same time, the TTC introduced an annual Metropass, good for a whole year. As a higher-cost option, the pass was available in transferable form: the first transferable pass on the TTC. Both versions were soon withdrawn and replaced by the 12-month discount plan for the regular monthly pass.

From July 1996 to March 2004, the pass carried a faux gold-stamped version of the Toronto Transit Commission's seal.

In 2000, the design was altered to include the "Toronto Millennium" logo, celebrating the changeover to a new millennium.

Fares on the provincially operated GO Transit are separate from TTC fares for travel within and outside of Toronto. A "Twin Pass", which combined a Metropass with a monthly GO Transit ticket for a specific journey at a discount compared to their individual prices, was available from 1988 until 2002.

In April 2004, the Metropass changed its design to a multi-colour vertical gradient, along with a different type of faux gold-imprinted "Metropass" logo (it uses the unique TTC font used in several subway stations). The colours and pattern of the gradient vary from month to month. In addition, the year was now printed in a bold font at the upper right, with the month imprinted in the same faux gold as the Metropass logo.

In September 2005, the Metropass became transferable (with ID required only to prove eligibility for the senior or student fare). The printable anti-fraud box was removed and replaced by wording suggesting the transfer of the pass to others when one was not using it.

Though the reverse side of the pass has always had the conditions of use printed on the reverse, it did not see much updating until the passes were made transferable in 2005, at which point a "No Pass Back" rule was added: in essence, a rider who enters the system using a pass must not hand it to someone outside the fare-paid area, which would allow both to use it at once.

In February 2006, to reduce lineups at subway station fare collector booths, the TTC introduced automated Metropass vending machines (accepting payment only by credit or debit cards) at some subway stations that dispensed weekly and monthly Metropasses. These were removed and replaced by new Presto vending machines by 2018, which allowed customers to purchase a new Presto card or load money or a digital monthly TTC pass onto the electronic fare cards as part of the Presto card rollout. In April 2006, the TTC day pass became valid all day on weekdays.

The TTC redesigned its Metropasses to include custom holograms and a yellow "activation" sticker, beginning with the July 2009 Metropasses, due to widespread counterfeiting of the Metropasses between January and May 2009. In addition, removing the "activation" sticker reveals a thin film, which is used to prevent the reapplication of the sticker, and removing the film would leave a sticky residue, in which dirt, fingerprints and other particles can obscure the hologram. The thin film reads, "Do not remove," to prevent curious Metropass users from removing it.

The TTC offered the Metropass Hot Dealz [sic], in which a current Metropass user and three guests received an admission discount at various venues and events, such as Casa Loma, the CN Tower, the Hockey Hall of Fame, Ontario Place, the Ontario Science Centre, and the Toronto Zoo. These competed directly with CityPASS as the Toronto version of CityPASS applies to some of the same attractions, except that CityPASS is marketed to tourists outside of Toronto, while the Metropass Hot Dealz is marketed to Torontonians. The TTC ceased offering the Metropass Hot Dealz in 2015 due to low demand.

A less expensive seniors' monthly pass was created in the 1980s, which was valid with government-issued photo ID or TTC senior's photo ID. The concessionary pass was later expanded to cover use by high school students aged 16–19 who present a valid photo ID.

While originally the student Metropass and other student fares were available only to high school students, a separate post-secondary Metropass was made available to university and college students (likewise requiring TTC-issued photo ID), starting with the September 2010 pass. Before September 2010, post-secondary institutions issued VIP Metropasses.

Until mid-2018, passengers were able to sign up for the Metropass Discount Plan (MDP), which was a 12-month commitment. Users received the Metropass in the mail before the start of every month. This program was initially expected to end as of 31 December 2018 as part of the transition to the Presto card, but due to rotating strikes by employees of Canada Post (the service provider that delivers the MDP passes) the program was discontinued earlier than anticipated on 31 October 2018 instead and MDP passes were not sent out for November or December 2018; it has since been replaced by a 12-month pass which is only available on Presto cards and can only be purchased online via the Presto website.

The Volume Incentive Pass (VIP) program allowed organizations to purchase adult Metropasses in bulk, which are then sold at a lower price than the MDP to commuters. The pass is transferable under the same rules as the weekly pass. The VIP program was discontinued on 31 December 2018.

The last month that physical Metropasses were issued was December 2018. Since January 2019, only a digital monthly TTC pass via Presto has been available. Most of these passes were discontinued with the introduction of automatic monthly fare capping in September 2026, leaving only the adult 12-month and post-secondary monthly passes available for purchase.

==== Weekly pass (2005–2019) ====
From September 2005 until March 2019, the TTC-only weekly pass was available for use. This was a type of Metropass valid for one week on the TTC; a concession version with a discount similar to the senior and youth discount for the monthly Metropass was also available. There was no post-secondary student version of the weekly TTC pass. These weekly passes were discontinued on 31 March 2019.

==== GTA weekly pass (1994–2019) ====
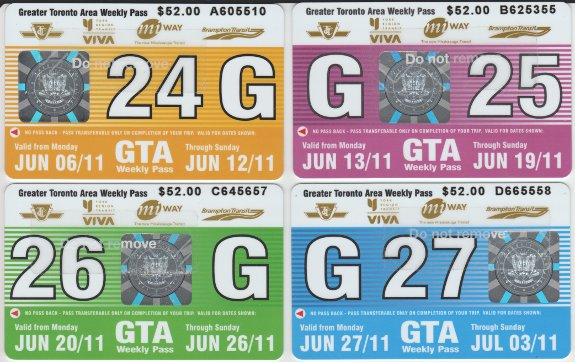
GTA weekly passes for June 2011

The GTA weekly pass was introduced in 1994 based on a recommendation of the provincial government. It was valid on the TTC, MiWay, YRT, and Brampton Transit. It was good for unlimited travel for seven days starting at 12:01 a.m. Monday until morning service started on the following Monday. It was sold at select locations starting the Thursday before the week of use, until Tuesday on the week of use.

GTA weekly pass holders were not required to pay additional fares when crossing a municipal boundary between areas served by the four participating agencies. However, extra fares were required for certain "premium" and "express" routes.

The Ministry of Transportation (MTO) provided a subsidy at the onset, but this was withdrawn in 1998. Revenues from pass sales were split between the participating agencies.

The GTA weekly pass was discontinued effective 1 December 2019, with the last pass being for the week of 25 November to 1 December 2019.

==== Convention and sports passes ====
On certain special occasions, the TTC has offered passes with periods of validity as appropriate. These have included the Papal Visits of 1984 and 2002. When the SkyDome was opened in 1989, Toronto Blue Jays baseball tickets doubled as TTC passes to encourage transit ridership.

=== Former fare arrangements ===
==== St. Clair time-based transfers (2005–2017) ====
In 2005, the TTC introduced "time-based" transfers allowing additional free rides within a two-hour time limit from the start of the vehicle's journey, even if the passenger made a stopover or reversed direction. The experiment was linked to the temporary substitution of parts of the 512 St. Clair streetcar route by buses due to track reconstruction. Time-based transfers were only available on the St. Clair route; on other routes, they were accepted only at normal transfer points as indicated on the transfer itself. This time-based transfer was not available to load on a Presto card, meaning Presto users who wished to take advantage of this pilot project needed to board at the front door of the vehicle in order to obtain the special time-based transfer, though transfers to other routes could be completed by tapping their Presto card again.

This program came to an end when the new four-door Flexity Outlook streetcars entered service on the 512 St. Clair route on 3 September 2017, as operators on the new streetcars are in a fully enclosed cab, which means the operator is not responsible for fare collection and is not able to provide paper transfers.

==== Zone fares (1954–1973) ====
From 1921 until 1953, one TTC fare was good for any distance within the pre-amalgamation City of Toronto. Where routes extended outside the city, extra fares were charged.

In 1954, Metropolitan Toronto ("Metro") was created, covering most of the city's post-1998 city limits. The TTC took on responsibility for transit within the entire area. A flat fare was not considered to be feasible for so large an area; so the TTC created the Central Zone, which roughly incorporated the City of Toronto, and set up a series of concentric semicircular rings around it as Suburban Zones 2–5, with an additional fare required for each one. Routes extending beyond the Metro limits continued to be separate radial routes, so the zones still had the effect of fare stages, but within Metro, it became possible to change buses within a suburban zone.

In 1956, Suburban Zones 1 and 2 were combined as Zone 2 and the Central Zone became the new Zone 1.

During this early period, the outer zones within Metro were relatively undeveloped and bus routes in them were sparse; but as development increased, there was pressure for lower suburban fares, and in 1962, the outer boundary of Zone 2 was extended to all the way to the Metro limit. Higher fares, still on a zonal basis along each radial route, now applied only on the few routes running beyond Metro; in effect, the zone boundaries outside Zone 2 had changed from semicircles to rough rectangles. Eventually, the beyond–Metro Zones 4 and 5 were combined into a new Zone 2 and the fares coordinated with those of adjacent transit agencies, which is the system used today.

In 1968, the Bloor–Danforth Subway was extended east and west through the boundary between Zones 1 and 2, but the subway remained part of Zone 1, due to the impracticality of a payment-on-exit system. On 21 January 1973, with construction already well advanced on a similar extension of the Yonge–University Subway, the TTC acceded to pressure to abolish the zone boundary, and all of Metro (now the unified City of Toronto) gained service at a single flat fare. (The new subway stations on both lines in what had been Zone 2 had not been designed for the change: their bus terminals were outside of the subway's fare-paid area. The layout of some stations allowed this to be easily corrected by relocating the fare barrier, but at other stations, this was unfeasible and they were not reconfigured unless they later underwent a major renovation.

==== Downtown Express fares (1990–2020) ====
Separate from the 900-series express buses which charge regular fares, the TTC previously operated five rush-hour Downtown Express bus routes (141–145) serving downtown and charging a double fare. In addition to the basic fare, passengers had to pay a supplement of one ticket or token, or the equivalent value. For example, an adult could pay with two tokens, or one token plus $3.25, or $6.50 in cash. Those transferring from regular routes paid only the supplement. Effective 26 August 2019, riders could pay both fares using the Presto card. Alternatively, Presto cardholders could load a monthly Downtown Express pass onto their Presto card with the option of choosing a discounted 12-month subscription Downtown Express pass. Beginning 23 March 2020, these routes were suspended owing to reduced ridership during the COVID-19 pandemic. As a result, the TTC discontinued sales of the monthly Downtown Express and 12-month Downtown Express Metropasses. By late October 2021, the downtown express routes had been delisted from the TTC customer website due to low demand.

==== GO/UPX co-fare (2018–2020) ====
From 7 January 2018 until it was discontinued effective 1 April 2020, Presto cardholders had the option to receive a discount of $1.50 (or $0.55 for senior, student, and youth customers) when they transfer between the TTC and Metrolinx's GO Transit or Union Pearson Express (UPX) services. The discount was available exclusively for Presto card users who used paid using their card balance.

==== Legacy TTC ticket and token phaseout ====
In late 2017, with the opening of Line 1's Toronto–York Spadina subway extension, the TTC began a process of discontinuing the sale of all legacy fare media products and introducing roaming customer service agents (CSAs) in place of collectors at those stations, as well as replacing collectors with CSAs at Sheppard West and Wilson stations, with the goal of eliminating them at all stations. To this end, the TTC had already discontinued the sale of legacy fare media products at Line 1 stations between Lawrence West and Vaughan Metropolitan Centre stations by 6 January 2019. This plan was not fully carried out because as of January 2022, at least one priority entrance at every station has a fare lane for riders paying by cash or legacy media and most subway stations still have collectors.

In 2018, the TTC had planned to phase out all legacy fare media and cash fares, eventually accepting only Presto fare media. As of 1 December 2019, the TTC discontinued the sale of legacy fare media (tokens, tickets, GTA weekly passes, and non-electronic day passes) at its remaining subway stations but continued to sell tokens and legacy tickets to school boards and social service agencies pending the availability of Presto bulk sales. The TTC also continued to sell legacy media to third-party vendors such as pharmacies and convenience stores. As of February 2022, the TTC was still operating both the Presto and legacy fare systems because the TTC viewed the Presto system rollout as incomplete. The TTC and Metrolinx were in a dispute as to what features Presto should provide. By November 2021, the TTC were considering revising this plan and proposed that, when Line 5 Eglinton and Line 6 Finch West open for revenue service, fare vending machines located on surface stop platforms would each have a ticket validator to accept legacy tickets.

By February 2023, the use of legacy tickets and tokens had declined, but the TTC was still making bulk sales of legacy media to social agencies, city programs and other institutions for distribution to their clients. There were about 200 institutions receiving bulk sales. As of February 2023, 40 percent of bulk sales were Presto tickets rather than legacy media.

Between 2022 and 2023, Metrolinx transitioned the TTC's bulk sales program to Presto, which allowed social agencies and institutions to purchase Presto tickets in bulk at adult, youth and senior prices directly through Metrolinx. Thus, effective 25 March 2023, the TTC stopped the sale of tokens at third-party retailers.

In 2024, the TTC estimated that 632,000 legacy tickets and 6,885,000 tokens were still in circulation. Because of the use of Presto tickets and open payment, legacy fare media represented only 0.1 percent of fare media collected. The TTC was planning to retire legacy fare media when Line 5 Eglinton and Line 6 Finch West open as both lines would have limited ability to accept legacy media. The TTC had previously announced in October 2024 it would no longer accept tokens and legacy tickets after 31 December 2024. Cash fares would still be accepted. In December 2024, the TTC extended the validity of legacy fare media to 1 June 2025, coinciding with the earliest possible opening dates of Line 5 Eglinton (which opened on 8 February 2026) and Line 6 Finch West, (which opened on 7 December 2025). Wheel-Trans customers, however, were allowed to use legacy media until 31 December 2025.
