= Social planning organizations in Canada =

An informal network of non-profit community organizations across Canada. The work of social planning organizations (also referred to as "Social Planning Councils") focuses on a range of community development and social justice issues.

== Purpose ==
The general purpose of social planning organizations is to help build and strengthen community.

Social planning organizations may undertake a variety of activities, including:

- Conducting social research
- Policy analysis and development
- Planning, convening and collaborating
- Social enterprise and social innovation
- Community mobilization, and
- Advocacy

Their work focuses around social issues affecting individuals and families, including:

- Diversity
- Immigrant/refugee and newcomer services
- Affordable housing
- Social determinants of health
- poverty and social exclusion
- "The working poor" and living wage
- Social determinants of health in poverty
- Social inequality
- GIS mapping and social indicator work

== Challenges ==
Social planning organizations face numerous challenges in their work:

- High complexity of social issues
- Government-Related Challenges
  - Implications of federal, provincial and municipal budget measures
  - Reshaping of the social policy agenda
  - Shifting role of the state in social policy (e.g. federal/provincial responsibilities, focus on the "fiscal imbalance," etc.)
  - Changing relationships with all levels of government
  - Changing provincial government priorities (greater challenges to put poverty on the agenda)
  - Impact of service downloading from government to private, non-government and non-profit organizations.
- Demographic Challenges
  - Growing immigrant and visible minority populations
  - Diverse types of communities (urban, rural, northern, remote, reserves)
  - Growing ethnic, cultural and linguistic diversity
- Economic and Infrastructure Challenges
  - Shifting regional economies (e.g. urbanization)
  - Changing social infrastructure needs
  - Increasing economic disparity (Income inequality metrics)

== History ==
Informal networking between SPOs has taken place to varying degrees since 1976. In the beginning, the Canadian Council on Social Development (CCSD) took a leadership role in bringing the local/regional councils together around social policy issues. Since the 1980s, individuals social planning organizations have taken a greater role in organizing SPO conferences and collaborating on social issues.

Due to the high number of social planning organizations in Ontario, communication and collaboration between SPOs in that province are more frequent than in other provinces across Canada. The Social Planning Network of Ontario (SPNO) has often facilitated discussions between Ontario-based organizations.

=== National SPO collaborations ===
In 2026, SPNO initiated meetings with social planning organizations across Canada.

The list below shows past projects with various SPOs.

==== Falling Fortunes (2006–2008) ====
A two-year national project (January 2006 through March 2008) aimed at identifying strategies to improve the income and wages, including the living wage, of young families and their children.

Partners:

- Community Services Council, Newfoundland and Labrador
- Family Service Association of Toronto
- Social Planning Council of Winnipeg
- First Call: BC Child and Youth Advocacy Coalition

==== Inclusive Cities Canada (2003) ====
A multi-year cross-Canada civic initiative with the purpose of enhancing social inclusion across Canada. The goals of Inclusive Cities Canada (ICC) are to strengthen the capacity of cities to create and sustain inclusive communities for the mutual benefit of all people, and to ensure that community voices of diversity are recognized as core Canadian ones.

Partners:

- Social Planning & Research Council of British Columbia
- Edmonton Social Planning Council
- Community Development Halton
- Community Social Planning Council of Toronto
- Human Development Council of Saint John
- Federation of Canadian Municipalities

== List of social planning organizations ==
=== Northwest Territories ===
- Alternatives North (A social justice organization to reduce poverty)

=== British Columbia ===
- Community Social Planning Council of Greater Victoria Victoria
- Social Planning & Research Council of British Columbia
- United Way Research Services - United Way of the Lower Mainland
- Mission Association for Social Planning
- Social Planning Council for the North Okanagan
- Sunshine Coast Social Planning Council - this is not in BC, it is in Australia
- Social Planning Council of Williams Lake and Area - Williams Lake, BC

=== Alberta ===
- Social Impact Collective (formally Edmonton Social Planning Council)

=== Saskatchewan ===
- Regina Council on Social Development

=== Manitoba ===
- Social Planning Council of Winnipeg

=== Ontario ===
- Social Planning Network of Ontario (SPNO)
- Amherstburg Community Services
- Lakeshore Community Services
- Community Social Planning Council Kingsville – Leamington
- Community Development Council Durham
- Community Development Council of Quinte
- Community Development Halton
- Social Planning Toronto
- Social Planning Council of York Region
- Essex Community Services
- Elgin Area Social Research and Awareness Council
- Lakehead Social Planning Council
- London Social Planning Council
- North Bay and Area Social Planning Council
- People & Organizations in North Toronto (POINT)
- Perth County Social Planning Council
- Peterborough Social Planning Council
- Social Development Council of Cornwall & Area (SDGCA)
- Social Planning Council of Cambridge & North Dumfries-Closed
- Social Planning Council of Kingston and District
- Social Planning Council Oxford
- Social Development Centre Waterloo Region
- Social Planning and Research Council of Hamilton
- Social Planning Council of Peel
- Social Planning Council of Sudbury
- Social Planning Council of Ottawa-Carleton
- South Essex Community Council
- United Way and Community Services of Guelph and Wellington

=== New Brunswick ===
- Human Development Council

=== Newfoundland and Labrador ===
- Community Services Council of Newfoundland and Labrador (CSCNL)

== Sources ==
- http://www.ccsd.ca/pubs/2006/spn/spo_meeting_may2006.pdf
- http://www.inclusivecities.ca/index.html
