= TTCriders =

- Founded: 2010; 16 years ago
- Type: Grassroots
- Location: Toronto, Canada
- Region served: City of Toronto
- Method: Advocacy; education; community engagement
- Key people: Andrew Pulsifer (executive director); Suhail Barot, Ryan Lindsay (board co-chairs)
- Website: ttcriders.ca

TTCriders is a grassroots, membership-based transit advocacy organization with a focus on better public transit service in Toronto. Its stated mission is "to build a TTC that works with and for transit riders". It was founded in 2010 by a coalition of organizations, including the Toronto Environmental Alliance, Social Planning Toronto, Toronto & York Region Labour Council, ACORN, and the Canadian Federation of Students. The organization employs a combination of online campaigns, transit debates and workshops to encourage political action on local transit issues. Since October 2013, the group has lobbied the Ontario provincial government to provide increased and sustained funding for the TTC.

== Activities ==
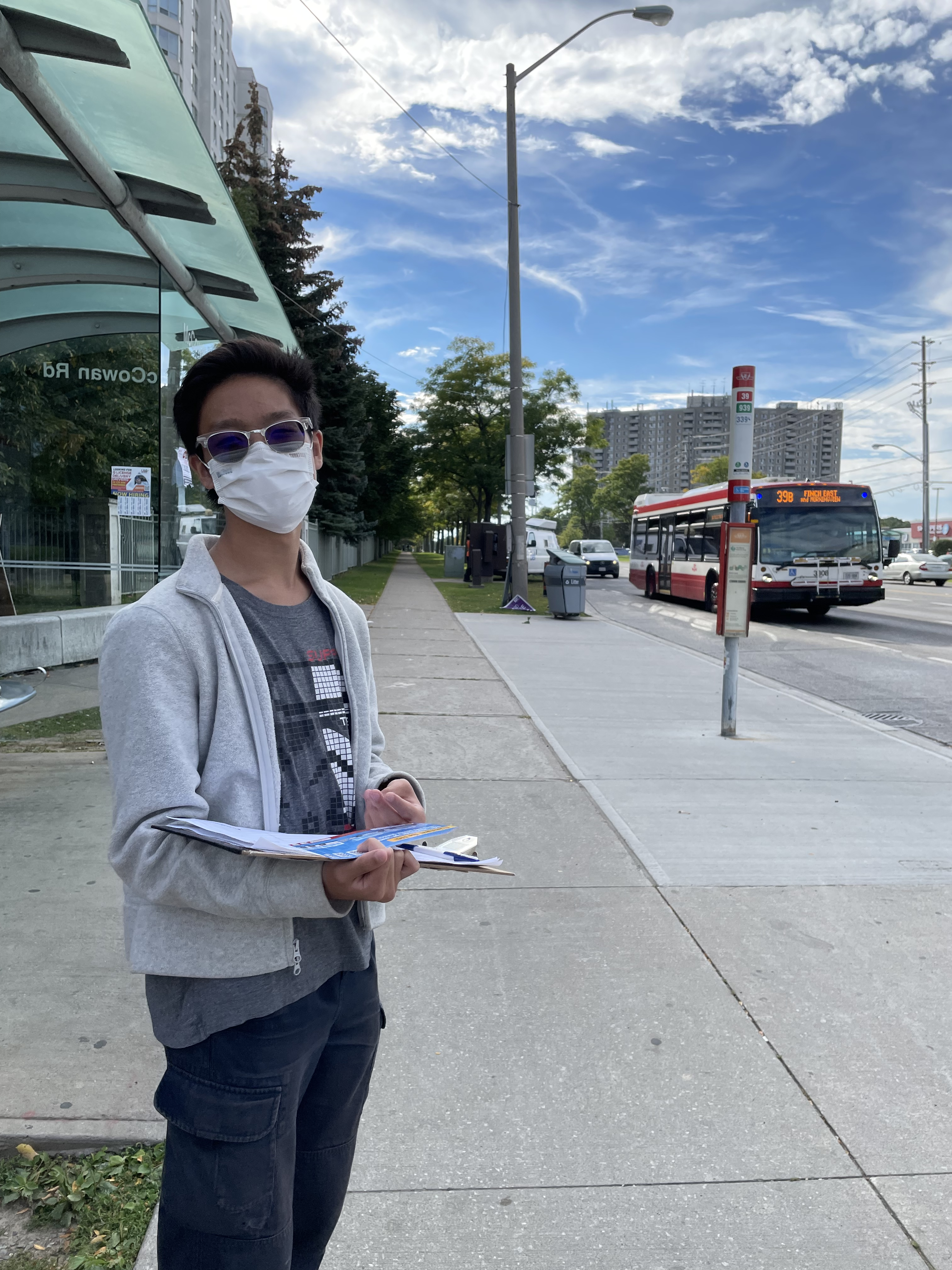
Canvasser for TTCriders

=== Transit Talks ===
On May 15, 2013, the group hosted Transit Talks, a discussion series that introduced riders to then-incoming TTC CEO, Andy Byford.

=== Online campaigns ===
In May 2014, the group launched #TTCSardines, a social media campaign where users could submit pictures of themselves on crowded subways. The campaign culminated with a march on Queen's Park, in which approximately 100 protestors wore silver headpieces resembling the head of a sardine.

In January 2015, the group launched #grumpyrider, an online selfie campaign modeled on the viral success of Grumpy Cat.

=== Political debates ===
On September 15, 2014, TTCriders partnered with the Ryerson Students Union to host a transit-focused mayoral debate between candidates Doug Ford, Olivia Chow and John Tory. Tory originally accepted but withdrew less than four hours before the debate was to start.

== See also ==
- Toronto Transit Commission
- GO Transit
- Metrolinx
- List of urban transit advocacy organizations
