= Transit watchdog =

A transit watchdog is an individual or group that provides public comment regarding public transit operations. Transit watchdogs attract a variety of contributors, from transit users to railfans, who offer feedback about service, operations, and funding matters.

== See also ==
- List of urban transit advocacy organisations
- Transit district
