= Social Planning Toronto =

Canadian nonprofit organization

- Founded: 1957
- Location: Toronto, Canada
- Region served: City of Toronto
- Method: Advocacy, Education, Community Engagement
- Key people: Jin Huh (Executive Director)
- Website: http://www.socialplanningtoronto.org/

Social Planning Toronto is a non-profit community organization, based in Toronto, Ontario, Canada that works to improve equity, social justice and quality of life for residents through community capacity building, community education and advocacy, policy research and analysis, and social reporting. The organization has conducted research and advocacy concerning inclusionary zoning, equitable use of city recreational spaces, the Ontario Human Rights Code policy on discrimination based on creed, and responses to the city's budget process.

The organization holds public forums for suggestions on what issues to prioritize.

Social Planning Toronto released the first poverty profiles for all 44 wards of Toronto, on 7 June 2012, which it declared "Destitution Day" because that was the approximate date when a person on welfare would run out of money if living at the poverty threshold.

== See also ==
- Social planning organizations in Canada
