= Alternatives for Community and Environment =

Environmental justice community in Roxbury

Alternatives for community and environment
- Formation: 1994
- Headquarters: 2225 Washington St Floor 2, Roxbury, MA 02119
- Executive Director: Dwaign Tyndal
- Deputy Director: Stephanie Williams
- Director of Youth Organizing: N/A
- Website: https://ace-ej.org/

Logos for Alternatives for Community and Environment

Alternatives for community and environment (ACE) is an environmental justice community organization located in Roxbury. While ACE has traditionally focused on the Roxbury community, it has recently broadened its efforts across New England to empower lower-income and communities of color who face disproportionate exposure to environmental hazards, including urban heat island effects, air pollution and lead poisoning.

Founded in 1994, ACE works to eradicate environmental racism, and classism and achieve environmental justice by empowering lower-income and minority communities to participate in decision-making regarding economic, environmental and social issues and providing legal supports.

ACE often forms cross-boundary coalitions and operates various youth, transportation networks, and environmental health programs such as Dudley Square Organizing Project (DSOP), Roxbury Environmental Empowerment Project (REEP), T Riders Union (TRU), the Safety Net, and Environmental Justice Legal Services (EJLS).

== Accomplishments ==
Some of ACE's notable accomplishments include the following:

- ACE's Environmental Justice Legal Services represented Chelsea residents in a 2007 case that prevented the construction of a diesel-fueled power plant adjacent to an elementary school.
- In 2013, The Safety Net fought with Roxbury residents to avert the development of a Boston University-sponsored Level 4 biolab that involved Ebola and Smallpox.

=== Cross-boundary coalitions ===
- In 1999, ACE collaborated with governmental agencies to implement Airbeat, a real-time air pollution monitoring system in Roxbury to address the asthma, which is the historic environmental justice issue in Roxbury. Youths investigated a potential link between high asthma rates and air pollution from diesel vehicles, leading to AirBeat's development. Airbeat data was used to advocate for clean air measures such as alternative fuels for buses.
- In September 2009, youth members of REEP and TRU, in collaboration with the Youth Way on the MBTA, reached an agreement with Massachusetts Secretary of Transportation James Aloisi to extend the hours for student passes and investigate the feasibility of an unrestricted youth pass.
- With partner organizations in the Green Justice Coalition, ACE and its Dudley Square Organizing Project helped ensure that environmental justice considerations were included in the landmark 2009 Massachusetts energy efficiency plan.
- In 2015, ACE partnered with MPHA(Massachusetts Public Health Alliance) and facilitated the implementation of Boston's Diesel Emission Reduction Ordinance(DERO). DERO address air pollution by reducing emission from transportations and buildings, especially communities that have disproportionately suffered from air pollution.
- In 2023, ACE’s partnership with MPHA facilitated the implementation of Energy Facilities Siting Reform bill, which ensures the impacts of air pollutions on environmental justice communities to be adequately addressed.
