= Transport Action Canada =

Canadian advocacy organization

- Formation: 1976; 50 years ago
- Type: Non-profit organization
- Headquarters: Ottawa, Canada
- Region served: Canada
- President: Terry Johnson
- Board of directors: Ted Bartlett; Matthew Buchanan; Bruce Budd; Marcus Garnet; Tim Hayman; David Jeanes; Terry Johnson; Steffen Knippel; Peter Miasek (2019-2020)
- Main organ: Board
- Affiliations: Transport Action Atlantic (Newfoundland, New Brunswick, Nova Scotia, Prince Edward Island); Transport Action British Columbia; Transport Action Ontario; Transport Action Prairies (Alberta, Manitoba, Saskatchewan); Transport Action Quebec
- Website: www.transportaction.ca
- Formerly called: Transport 2000 Canada

Transport Action Canada is a non-profit, consumer-based organization that promotes sustainable transport through advocacy and education. It is concerned with all modes of public transport, such as passenger train service, aviation including air safety, and urban transit.

The association functions as a citizen-based advocacy group, compared to transport industry based bodies such as the Railway Association of Canada or the Canadian Urban Transit Association.

== Activities ==
The association regularly communicates with government and industry officials to promote sustainable transport views, including Transport Canada and elected officials of all government levels.

Canadian news media agencies frequently interview Transport 2000 Canada officials on transportation matters.

== History ==
The organization was founded as Transport 2000 Canada in 1976 following concerns about the future of passenger trains in Canada. Passenger train service in Canada had declined in the latter 20th century as train routes were being eliminated by Canadian National Railway and Canadian Pacific Railway.

In 1993, Transport 2000 became one of seven Canadian non-for-profit organisations supported by The Samuel and Saidye Bronfman Family Foundation's Urban Issues program.

The association continued to monitor and address developments in the national passenger transportation system, especially since the 1978 formation of Via Rail Canada to provide national passenger train service.

The association later formed its Air Passenger Safety Group, especially prompted by the September 1998 Swissair Flight 111 disaster off the Nova Scotia coastline.

Urban transit is an increasingly important topic addressed by the national and regional associations of the organization. The organization's support for the O-Train pilot project (today's Line 2) was a significant factor in returning rail transit service to Ottawa in 2001. Transport Action Canada has since been critical of the subsequent plans to develop the North-South Light Rail Transit line, citing the proposals to combine the downtown train with bus congestion, disruption to existing O-Train travel (today's Line 2) during the line's construction, and longer-term viability of the proposed North-South route.

National office facilities for Transport Action Canada are located in Ottawa, Ontario.

The association has been a contributor to the development of aviation regulation, particularly as it relates to airline passengers, though Transport Canada's Canadian Aviation Regulation Advisory Council (CARAC) process.

== Organization ==
Transport Action Canada is composed as a federation of the following like-minded regional associations:

- Transport Action Atlantic – Newfoundland, New Brunswick, Nova Scotia, Prince Edward Island
- Transport Action Quebec – Quebec
- Transport Action Ontario – Ontario
- Transport Action Prairies – Alberta, Manitoba, Saskatchewan
- Transport Action British Columbia – British Columbia

== Publications ==
The organization publishes a newsletter titled Transport Action which provides news and opinion on topical transportation matters. This is published six times per year and primarily distributed to its members.

Members of Transport Action Canada are often members of one or more of the affiliated regional associations which often publish their own newsletters.

A bulletin of transport-related news is also produced on an approximately weekly basis. This "hotline" is published on the association's official website.

== See also ==
- Campaign for Better Transport (United Kingdom) (formerly known as Transport 2000)
- Canadian Urban Transit Association
- Category:Transportation companies of Canada
- List of urban transit advocacy organisations
- National Association of Railroad Passengers
- Transportation in Canada
- Via Rail Canada
