= TRU Winnipeg =

The Transit Riders Union of Winnipeg was formed in July 2005, a year after Sam Katz's first term as Mayor of Winnipeg.

== Background ==
On September 29, 2004 the City Council of Winnipeg voted to abandon plans for a bus rapid transit (BRT) system for Winnipeg.

Several weeks later, Dallas Hansen returned to his home town of Winnipeg and discovered the online message board, NewWinnipeg.com. Among the thread topics, some were about rapid transit in Winnipeg. Dallas had posted his opinions of the BRT plan and had also discovered, around the same time, a website that Jim Jaworski had created about local Transit issues, including the subway plan published by Norman D. Wilson. He wrote an op-ed piece published in the Winnipeg Free Press on November 29, 2004 — Mass Transit Best Route for Winnipeg.

Several more months had passed, and Dallas, Jim, Jeff Lowe, and another person who was interested in the re-urbanization of central Winnipeg, Robert Galston, had decided it was time to form a new Transit rider group.

A previous transit rider group formed by Jim Jaworski and others in the late 1990s had fizzled because there was never a consensus over the form of rapid transit Winnipeg should have, while others believed that Winnipeg doesn't need rapid transit at all.

The TRUWinnipeg website domain was registered in early July 2005 and contains several archival and new articles and photos about the reurbanification of downtown Winnipeg.

June 2008 had the group's website viewed by 2,070 individuals, a new record.
