= Tri-State Transportation Campaign =

- Type: Non-profit
- Industry: Non-profit and activism
- Founded: 1993
- Headquarters: New York, New York, United States
- Key people: Nick Sifuentes (executive director)
- Revenue: 321,962 United States dollar (2016)
- Total assets: 500,325 United States dollar (2022)
- Website: Tri-State Transportation Campaign

The Tri-State Transportation Campaign (TSTC) is a non-profit advocacy and policy organization dedicated to reducing car and truck dependency and promoting a "more balanced, environmentally sound and equitable transportation network" in downstate New York, New Jersey and Connecticut. TSTC's methods include political and media advocacy including a self-published blog ("Mobilizing the Region"), original research and analysis, litigation, and community organizing.

== History ==
TSTC was launched in the early 1990s by a dozen New York, New Jersey, and Connecticut environmental and planning organizations that were alarmed by the mobility, economic, quality of life and environmental implications of worsening auto and truck dependence in the metropolitan area, and believed that the 1991 ISTEA federal transportation legislation created new opportunities to advocate for sustainable state transportation policy. Some of these founding organizations include Connecticut Fund for the Environment, Environmental Defense Fund, New Jersey Public Interest Research Group, Regional Plan Association, Scenic Hudson, and the NYPIRG Straphangers Campaign.

The Campaign acquired its own staff in 1993 and incorporated as an independent non-profit corporation in 1994. Tri-State has offices in New York City, Albany, NY and Camden, NJ.

== Campaign priorities ==
The Tri-State Transportation Campaign and its allies claim to have achieved their goals of changing transportation planning and policies—particularly in reducing funding for road widening—over the past 13 years. In New Jersey, the organization was a key proponent of the New Jersey Department of Transportation's policy of connecting land use planning with transportation projects and has opposed many road improvements. In New York, TSTC has consistently promoted additional funding for transit services, especially suburban bus systems, obtaining grants from the New York State Department of Transportation for the same purpose.

=== Reducing funding for road expansion ===
TSTC has persuaded elected and appointed officials to cancel or scale down plans for Route 92 in Middlesex County, NJ, the Cross-Westchester Expressway in Westchester County, NY, the Long Island Expressway in Queens, the Goethals Bridge, the Staten Island Expressway, and Route 206 in Byram, NJ. TSTC has argued that the planned expansion of the Garden State Parkway between exits 30 and 80 will not provide long-term congestion relief and sued the NJ Department of Environmental Protection in 2009 over its approval of environmental permits for the project. TSTC opposed NYSDOT's Route 347 widening project on Long Island. This project is now being recast as a suburban boulevard with a greenway as originally proposed by the Committee for a New 347.

=== Increasing funding for mass transit ===
TSTC seeks to convince policymakers to maintain and increase subsidies for mass transit operations and construction projects. It opposed a planned 2010 fare increase for NJ Transit and plans to cut service on New York's Metropolitan Transportation Authority-run transit systems.

=== Revitalizing cities ===
TSTC works with community groups in Newark, advocating for streets that are more walkable and more attractive for development. In Trenton, TSTC supports the city's plan to convert a portion of Route 29 into a waterfront boulevard. Working with groups in the South Bronx, TSTC succeeded in inserting plans for removing the Sheridan Expressway into New York State Department of Transportation studies for the area. In Connecticut, TSTC is working to build support for a removal of Route 34 in New Haven and its replacement with a boulevard and mixed-use development.

=== Reforming state transportation agencies ===
Consistent analysis of spending and project priorities in New Jersey resulted in a significant diminution of spending for new highway capacity in the state. In the mid-nineties, the NJDOT was spending over 50 percent of its capital dollars on new or wider highways. In 2008, that number had decreased to 1.5 percent. The New Jersey DOT is adopting transportation-efficient land use planning, which seeks to reduce the heavy car trip generation that characterizes sprawl development. The Connecticut Department of Transportation and New York Department of Transportation are now also considering ways to incorporate land use into project design and planning. In 2008, NYSDOT announced a GreenLITES program to incorporate sustainability into transportation projects, and made the redesign of Route 347 on Long Island a model project for the program.

=== Introducing roadway pricing to manage traffic ===
The TSTC helped advance New York City's 2007 congestion pricing plan, which was approved by the New York City Council but failed to pass through the New York State Legislature. In 2000, TSTC worked to persuade the New Jersey Turnpike Authority and the Port Authority of New York and New Jersey to implement time-variable tolls that charge drivers more to travel during congested periods. Both agencies report reductions in growth of peak-hour traffic. In 2008, the peak/off-peak differential was increased. In Connecticut, a state without tolls, TSTC is pushing for congestion pricing as a way to manage traffic and pay for transportation projects. TSTC also advocated for cashless, all-electronic tolling on the NJ Turnpike and Garden State Parkway and helped to secure studies on cashless tolling at the Port Authority and MTA.

=== Mitigating truck impacts ===
TSTC broadcasts projected truck traffic increases throughout New Jersey and New York City and works with environmental justice groups and neighborhoods to win better management of truck traffic.

=== Bus rapid transit & suburban bus systems ===
TSTC advocated for CTfastrak, which is the first true bus rapid transit system in the region. In Long Island, Tri-State worked with civic groups to provide support for bus riders calling for adequate funding and reliable service. And for over 10 years, TSTC has been advocating for improved bus service over the rebuilding of the Tappan Zee Bridge, and was a member of the Transit Task Force that developed specific recommendations for implementation on the new bridge.

=== Complete streets ===
TSTC advocates for Complete Streets, not only for communities to adopt policies or ordinances, but to fund their implementation as well. In 2014, TSTC worked with the City of Stamford, Connecticut, to draft a Complete Streets ordinance, and partnered with BikeWalkCT on Connecticut’s first ever Complete Streets Forum. In 2012, TSTC was a lead advocate for the successful passage of New York’s Complete Streets law. TSTC advocated for local Complete Streets policies throughout New Jersey: Cranford, Newark, Trenton, Fanwood, Linden, Mantua Township, Camden, and Woodbury. TSTC's advocacy contributed to half of the Smart Growth America's top eight NJ Complete Streets policies in 2013 [Trenton, Linden, Camden, and Cranford]. In New York, TSTC successfully campaigned for a Complete Streets implementation fund for Suffolk County, which was created in June 2014, a year and half after the County adopted a Complete Streets policy. Also, in conjunction with regional partners, TSTC developed a “Complete Streets in a Box” toolkit to help local legislators and advocates advance safer streets policies in their own communities. In 2013, TSTC developed two webinars (1, 2) demonstrating how to successfully implement Complete Streets after policy adoption.
