= Tunnel of Provença =

High-speed railway tunnel between Sants and La Sagrera, Barcelona

Tunnel Sants - Sagrera Tunnel of Eixample
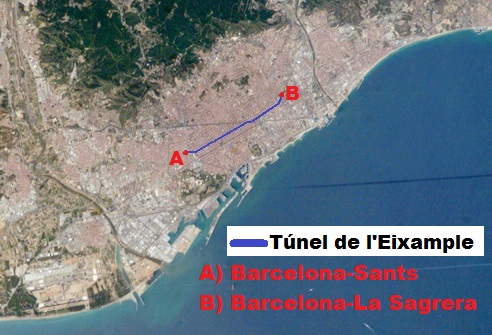
- Route of the tunnel between Barcelona-Sants (A) and the future station of Sagrera (B)

Overview
- Owner: Adif
- Locale: Barcelona, Catalonia, Spain
- Transit type: Rail transport tunnel
- Line number: LAV Madrid-Barcelona-Francia
- Number of stations: No intermediate stations

Operation
- Began operation: January 8, 2013
- Operators: AVE, TGV, and Avant; Renfe amnd SNCF
- Character: Lateral Signalling Block System

Technical
- System length: 5,78 km
- No. of tracks: 2
- Electrification: 2x25 kV 50 Hz

41°22′44.49″N 2°8′23.6″E

The Barcelona Sants–la Sagrera High-Speed Tunnel or Sants–Sagrera Tunnel (Catalan and Spanish: Túnel de Sants–Sagrera) also known as the "Eixample Tunnel" or "Provença Tunnel" is an urban railway tunnel located in Barcelona and owned by Adif. The tunnel, which connects Barcelona–Sants station to the future Barcelona-Sagrera station, connects the Madrid–Barcelona high-speed rail line to the Perpignan–Barcelona high-speed rail line. It was inaugurated on January 8, 2013, along with the section between Barcelona–Sants and Figueres-Vilafant on the Madrid-Barcelona-France high-speed line. Commercial operation by Renfe Operadora trains began on January 9, 2013.

== History ==
=== Planning ===
The plan to build the tunnel between Barcelona–Sants station and la Sagrera began to take shape with the announcement of the Madrid-Barcelona-France high-speed rail project. In March 2003, the first section of the high-speed line between Madrid and Lleida was inaugurated. Three years later, on December 19, 2006, the section between Lleida and Tarragona was opened, with plans to inaugurate the section to Barcelona in 2007. However, that segment did not come into service until February 20, 2008. José Blanco, Spain's Minister of Development at the time, assured that the high-speed line to Figueres, including this railway tunnel, would be inaugurated by the end of 2012.

=== Construction ===
Adif awarded the contract for the construction of the tunnel on 18 January 2008, with a planned investment of 179.3 million euros and a completion period of 35 months. On 26 March 2010 the tunnel boring machine Barcino, 105 metres long and weighing 2,300 tonnes, began to bore from the starting shaft located at the intersection of Carrer Mallorca and Carrer Biscaia. On 15 September and 8 November 2010, part of Carrer Mallorca affected by the construction of the tunnel was reopened to traffic. On 14 October 2010 the tunnel boring machine Barcino bored the section running alongside the Glory Façade of the Basilica of the Sagrada Família, and in mid-December of the same year it finished boring the section running under Avinguda Diagonal, which joins the tunnel sections under Mallorca and Provença streets. By that date, the tunnel boring machine had bored a total of 2.8 km of the 5.1 km planned.

On 19 December 2010, the Perpignan-Figueres high-speed line was inaugurated, and the date of entry into operation of the railway tunnel was delayed until 2013 due to the economic crisis that began in 2008, which led to a cut in public investment in Spain of 6,045 million euros. On 26 July 2011, the Barcino tunnel boring machine finished boring the tunnel, reaching the extraction shaft located between Provença and Entença streets, after travelling almost 5.1 km from the starting shaft in 16 months. At the beginning of December 2011, the shafts on Carrer de Provença used for the maintenance of the tunnel boring machine began to be covered, and on 21 December 2011 the sections affected by the construction of the tunnel on the same street were reopened to traffic. Adif announced on 9 November 2012 that the section of track between Sants station and Mollet del Vallès, including the railway tunnel between Sants and La Sagrera, would be electrified on 26 November 2012. The forecast officially maintained by the Ministry of Development is that high-speed trains would start running without interruption from Barcelona to Paris and vice versa in April 2013.

=== Testing and inauguration ===
Ana Pastor, then Minister of Development, announced on 22 November 2012 that the section between Barcelona–Sants and Figueres-Vilafant would enter service in January 2013, once the works on this section, which were scheduled for December 2012, had been completed. At the end of October 2012, Renfe Operadora carried out tests with Class 103 trains between the Mollet del Vallès junction and Vilobí d'Onyar (Girona), and on 4 December 2012 technical validation tests began on the infrastructure and superstructure between Barcelona–Sants and Figueres-Vilafant. Ricard Font, director general of transport of the Generalitat de Catalunya, announced on 7 December 2012 that the section between Barcelona-Sants and Figueres-Vilafant, including the Sants-Sagrera high-speed tunnel, would be inaugurated on 8 January 2013, according to a communiqué sent to the Generalitat by Renfe Operadora and Adif. On the same day, a 46-year-old worker died inside the tunnel as a result of a collision between two machines while the tracks were being built. On 17 December 2012, tests of Class 103 commercial trains operated by Renfe Operadora began, the aim was to carry out commercial simulations in order to fine-tune all the aspects involved in providing a good high-speed service on the new section of the line. These tests meant the circulation for the first time of a commercial high-speed train through the Sants-Sagrera high-speed tunnel.

The tunnel was inaugurated on 8 January 2013 at 11:01 a.m., together with the section between Barcelona-Sants and Figueres-Vilafant of the Madrid-Barcelona-France high-speed line. The inauguration ceremony was attended by the Prince of Asturias and the presidents of the Spanish Government, Mariano Rajoy, and of the Generalitat de Catalunya, Artur Mas, among other authorities. (Note: The opening ceremony was also attended by the Minister of Development, Ana Pastor, the Minister of Territory and Sustainability, Santi Vila, the Mayor of Barcelona, Xavier Trias, the Mayor of Girona, Carles Puigdemont, and the Mayor of Vilafant, Consol Cantenys.) On 9 January 2013 it began commercial operation by high-speed trains operated by Renfe Operadora. The first northbound train was Avant 34253 with origin in Barcelona-Sants and destination Figueres-Vilafant, with 142 people on board, and the first southbound train was AVE 03082 with origin in Figueres-Vilafant and destination Barcelona-Sants, with 79 people on board. On 12 February 2013 a train of the French operator SNCF ran through the tunnel for the first time, specifically branch 736 of the TGV Dasye series. This operation was part of the homologation tests for French trains to run on the Spanish General Interest Railway Network (RFIG).. On 15 December 2013, the first TGV with passengers of the French operator SNCF ran between Barcelona-Sants and Paris-Lyon.

== Construction phases ==
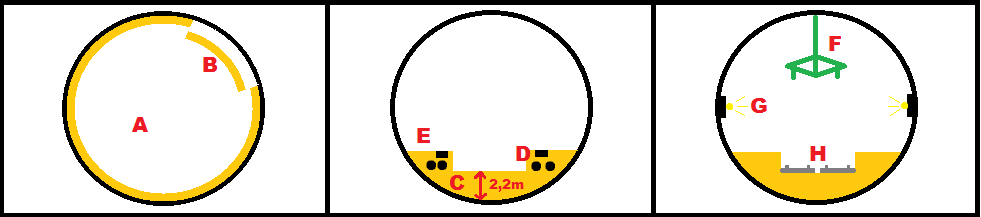
Construction phases of the tunnel.

The construction phases of the Sants-Sagrera tunnel were as follows:

- Phase 1: boring of the tunnel by the Barcino tunnel boring machine (A) and placement of the segments by the same tunnel boring machine (B).
- Phase 2: filling of the base of the tunnel with concrete (C), construction and installation of the railway ducts (D). (Note: Railway ducts consist of communication, safety, signalling, electrical and fire brigade ducts.) and construction of the lateral passageways for the movement and evacuation of people (E).
- Phase 3: installation of the catenary (F), installation of the tunnel interior lighting systems (G) and laying of the slab tracks (H).

== Route ==
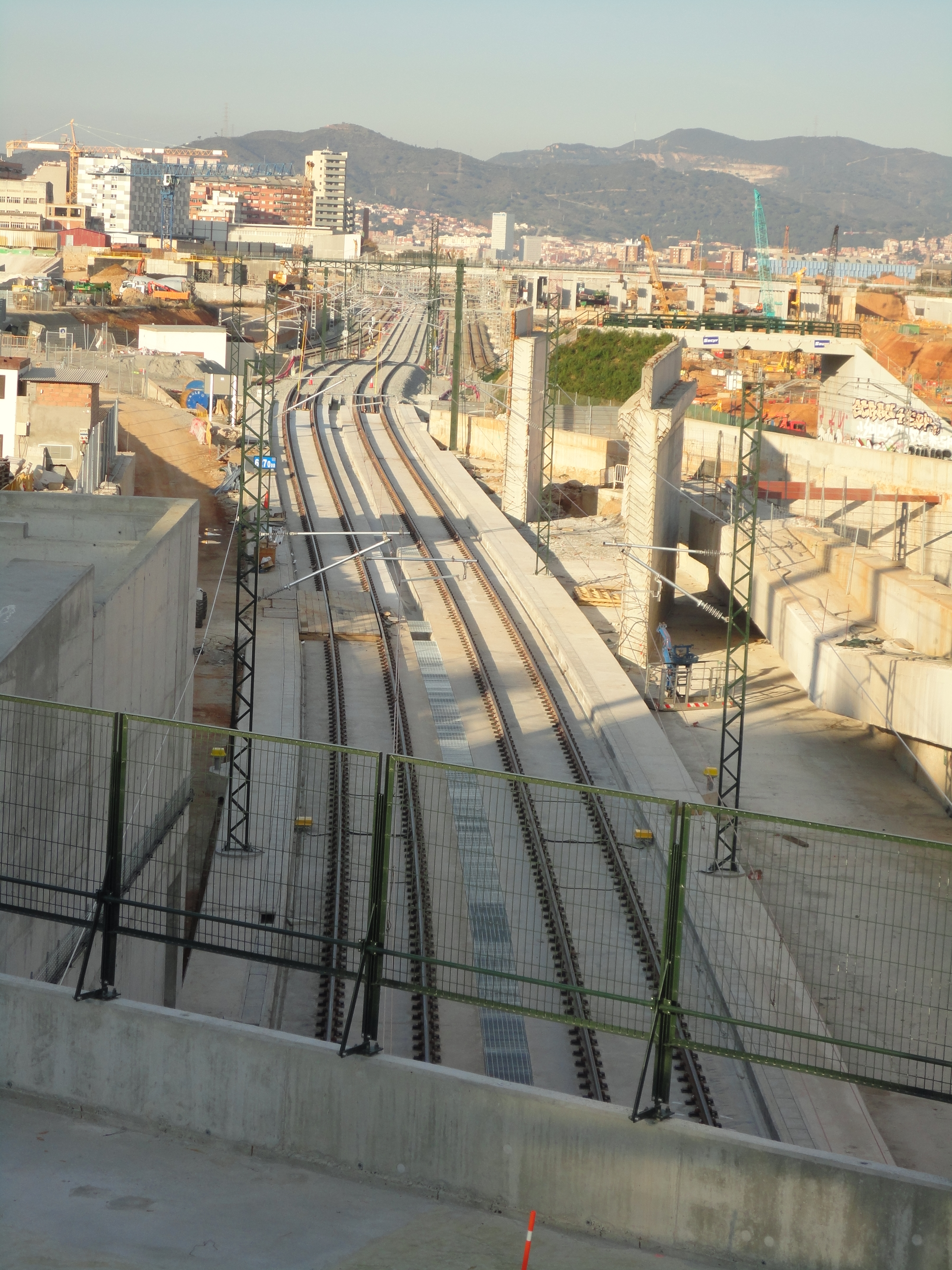
Tunnel exit on the Sagrera side, where the Barcelona-Sagrera station, currently under construction, is located.

The Sants-Sagrera high-speed tunnel runs from Barcelona-Sants station to the future Barcelona-Sagrera station along Provença Street, Avinguda Diagonal, and Mallorca Street, covering a length of 5.78 km. It is the only high-speed rail tunnel crossing Barcelona with a track gauge of 1,435 mm (UIC gauge).

=== Controversy ===
The railway tunnel sparked significant controversy among part of Barcelona's population due to its route, which affects several of the city's landmarks. A platform called AVE pel litoral was created to demand a modification of the planned route through Provença and Mallorca Streets, where the Expiatory Temple of the Sagrada Familia and La Pedrera are located, proposing a new route along Barcelona's coastline. José Blanco, Minister of Development from 2009 to 2011, described the tunnel's construction as follows:

"This tunnel has the highest safety standards among construction projects being undertaken worldwide. The best technicians in the country have worked on safety measures to ensure the security of buildings and citizens, and I am confident that the public will have noticed this." — José Blanco López, La Vanguardia.

On February 8, 2010, UNESCO technicians Rolf Katzenbach and Wolfram Jägertal met in Barcelona with the temple's board of trustees and some neighborhood associations to assess the impacts of the tunnel's construction near the Sagrada Familia and to hear their objections to the route. The Sagrada Família Board of Trustees requested five times that the Audiencia Nacional halt the tunnel's construction through Mallorca Street due to safety risks to the Glory Façade and the central nave of the temple. The construction project included a 240-meter-long, 40-meter-deep protective screen made of piles 1.5 meters in diameter to safeguard the monument from ground movements generated during the tunnel's construction.

In October 2010, the tunnel boring machine passed through the section of the tunnel adjacent to the monument without causing any damage. The Parliament of Catalonia approved a motion requesting a moratorium on the tunnel's construction, supported by a majority of the Barcelona City Council. The current route was defended only by the PSC and ICV parties, while CiU and the PPC proposed an alternative route through Vallès Occidental with a station in the municipality of Sant Cugat del Vallès. ERC instead suggested rerouting the tunnel through Aragó Street instead of Mallorca Street, where the ESagrada Família is located.

== Characteristics ==
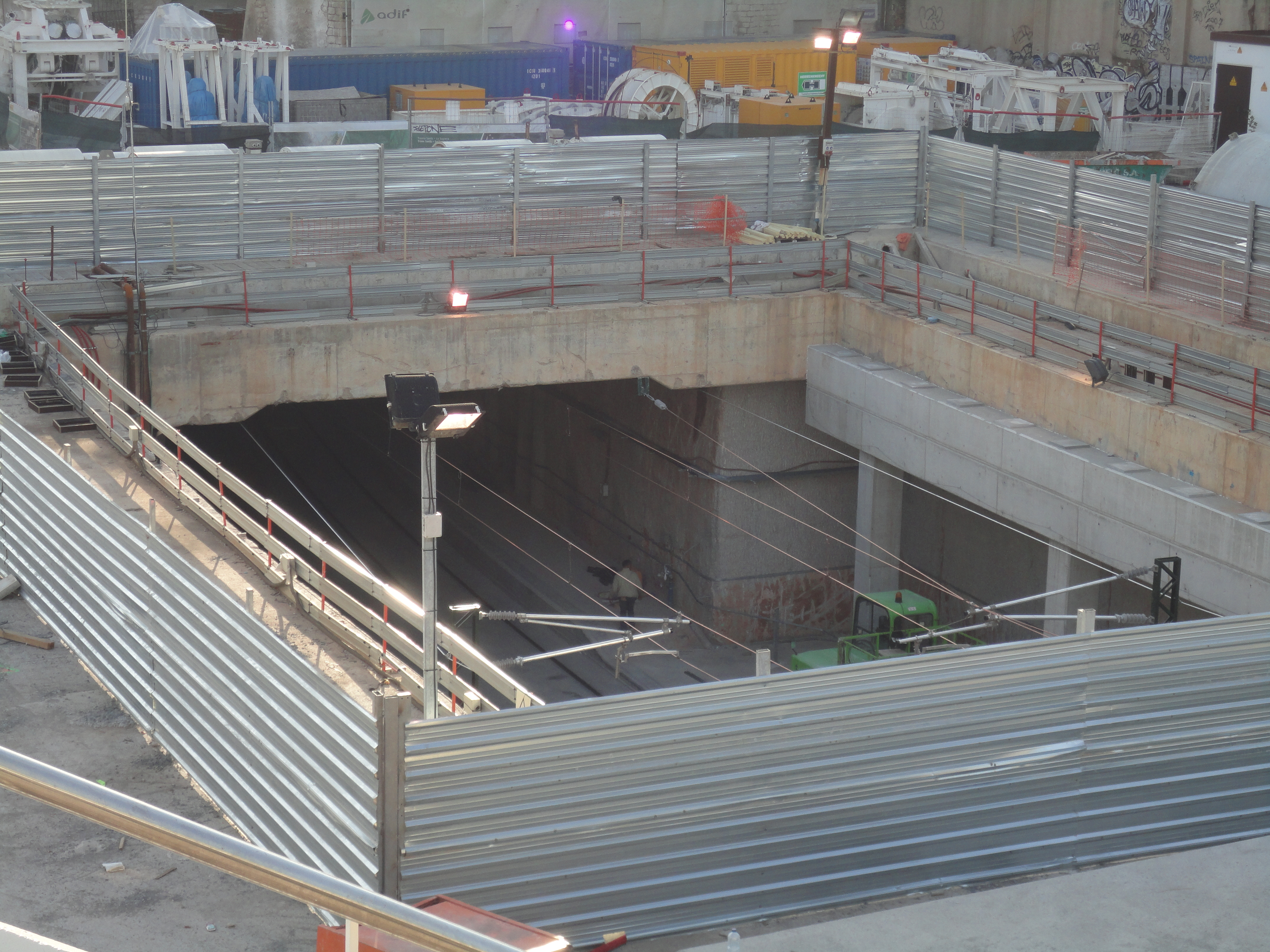
Construction of the tunnel near the Barcelona-La Sagrera station.

The main features of the Sants–Sagrera high-speed tunnel and the Barcino tunnel boring machine are:

Tunnel characteristics		References
Total length	5.781 meters	
"Between screens" section length	686 meters	
Length of section drilled by TBM	5095 meters	
Maximum depth	41 meters	
Electrification	2x25 kV 50 Hz	
Track gauge	1435 millimeters (UIC gauge)	
Cross-sectional area	85 m²	
Inner diameter	10.4 meters	
Emergency exits	6	
Concrete mixers used for construction	14 000	
Side walkways	Yes, 1,2 meters wide	
Rail type	60 kilogram/meter, UIC type	
Safety systems	ERTMS y ASFA	
Capacity	480 trains/day	
TBM characteristics		References
Name	Barcino	
Length	150 meters	
Weight	2,300 tons	
Drilling method	EPB (Earth Pressure Balance)	
Cutter head diameter	12 meters	
Completed rings	2,838	
Segments installed	19 824	

== Operations ==
Once the tunnel between Barcelona-Sants and Figueres-Vilafant was inaugurated, train circulation began, with 18 high-speed passenger trains (9 trains in each direction). Since April 2013, trains operated by the French company Société Nationale des Chemins de Fer Français (SNCF) and Renfe Operadora have connected Spain and France without requiring transfers at the Figueres-Vilafant station.

== See also ==
- Transport in Catalonia
