= Torre La Sagrera =

- Interactive map of the Torre La Sagrera area

General information
- Status: Never built
- Type: office, hotel
- Location: Barcelona, Catalonia, Spain
- Coordinates: 41°25′47″N 2°11′50″E
- Cost: € 250 million

Height
- Roof: 148 m (486 ft)

Technical details
- Floor count: 34
- Floor area: 79,311 square metres (853,700 sq ft)

Design and construction
- Architect: Frank Gehry
- Main contractor: Consorci de la zona franca

Torre La Sagrera also Sagrera Tower also Torre del Triangulo Ferroviario was a failed skyscraper project designed by Frank Gehry in Barcelona, Catalonia, Spain. It would have been 148 metres tall, have 34 floors, and would have become the third tallest building in Barcelona behind Torre Mapfre and Hotel Arts, and sixteenth tallest in Spain.

The building was to be located at the end of the Rambla de Prim (Railway Triangle Sagrera Sant Andreu), giving the streets of the Via Trajan, Josep Soldevila and the way in the future Barcelona Sagrera railway station is expected to be the largest of Spain. Next to the tower, which was planned to house offices, there will be a public park and a museum of transportation. The tower would have had construction costs of 250 million euros.

== See also ==
- List of tallest buildings and structures in Barcelona
