= Siemens Velaro =

Family of high-speed electric multiple unit trains

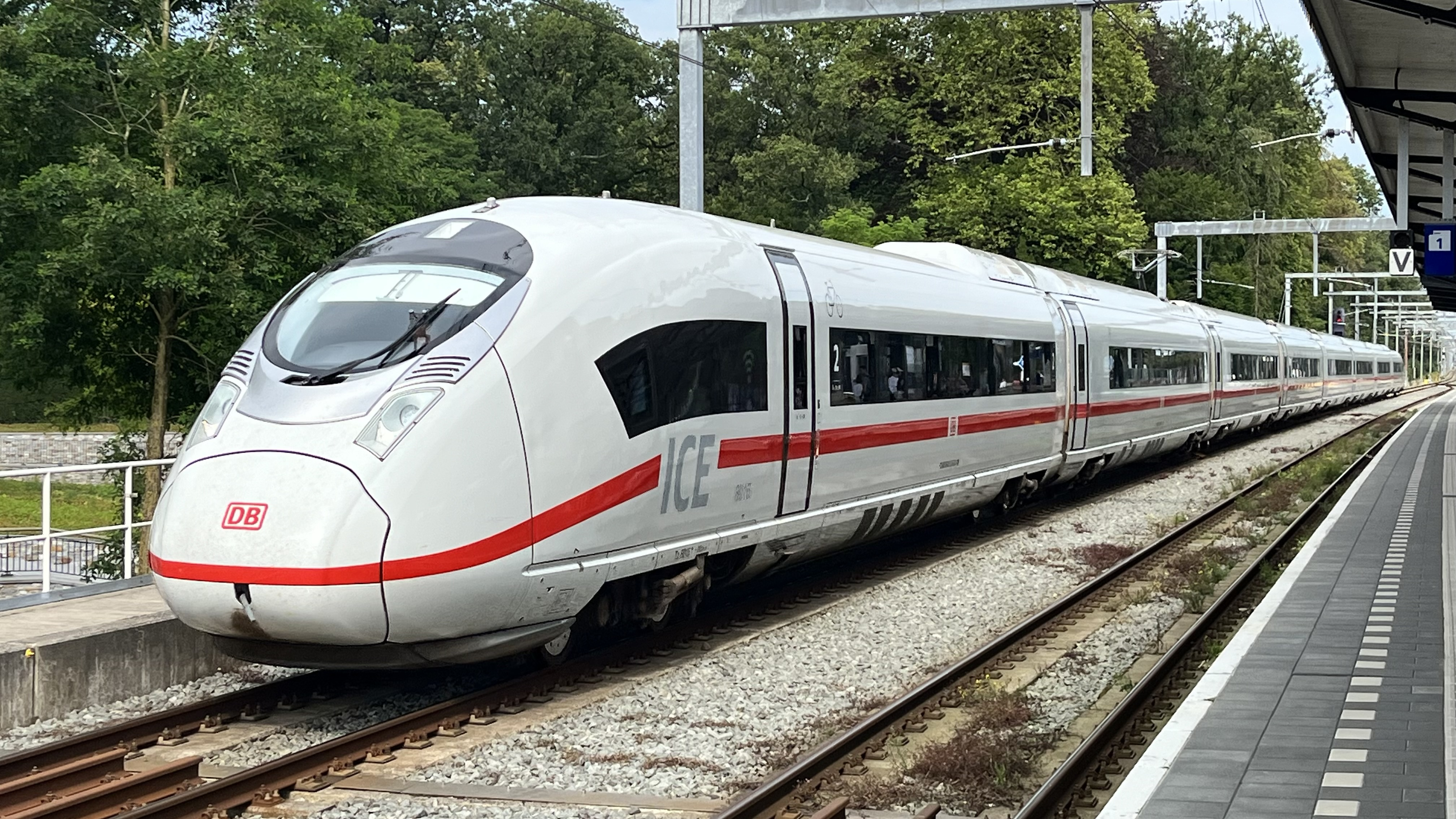
- Velaro MS of Deutsche Bahn
Type and origin
- Builder: Siemens Mobility
- Total produced: ICE 3 neo: 65; Velaro D: 17; Velaro E: 26; Velaro RUS: 20; CRH3C/CRH380B: 80 plus 180 ordered Velaro e320: 17 (France, Belgium, the Netherlands, UK); Velaro TR: 19 (Turkey)
Specifications
- Current pickup: Pantograph
- MU working: Yes, with identical units
- Couplers: Scharfenberg
Career
- Operators: Deutsche Bahn; Renfe; China Railway; Russian Railways; Eurostar; Turkish State Railways

Siemens Velaro is a family of high-speed electric multiple unit trains built by Siemens. It is based on the ICE 3 high-speed trains initially co-manufactured by Siemens and Bombardier for German national rail operator Deutsche Bahn (DB).

In 1994, Deutsche Bahn were the first to order 50 units of the high-speed trains, branded as ICE 3, that would eventually evolve into the Velaro family. This initial batch of ICE-3 trainsets was built by a consortium with Bombardier, and first delivered for service in 1999. A version based on this train without Bombardier patents was developed by Siemens and has been marketed as Velaro since. Velaro derivatives have been introduced in Germany, Belgium, France, the United Kingdom, the Netherlands, Spain, China, Russia, and Turkey.

In July 2006, a Siemens Velaro train-set (AVE S-103) reached 403.7 km/h (250.8 mph), which was the land speed record for rail vehicles and unmodified commercial service trainsets.

In 2018, Siemens announced a major design iteration termed Velaro Novo. It is scheduled to enter service in 2028 with Brightline West, using an American variant called the American Pioneer 220. This variant is also tentatively scheduled to enter revenue service with California High-Speed Rail in 2032.

== Variants ==
=== Velaro E (AVE Class 103) ===
The Velaro E is a version of the Velaro family used by Renfe for operations in Spain. In 2001, Renfe ordered sixteen Velaros designated AVE Class 103. The order was later increased to a total of 26 trains. The first units were delivered in July 2005 and completed their first test runs in January 2006. The trains serve the 621 km (386 mi) Barcelona–Madrid line at speeds up to 310 km/h (195 mph) for a travel time of 2 hours 30 minutes.

On 15 July 2006, a train achieved a top speed of 403.7 km/h (250.8 mph) between Guadalajara and Calatayud on the Madrid-Barcelona line, this is the Spanish record for railed vehicles. Until 3 December 2010 it was also a world record for unmodified commercial service trainsets, as the earlier TGV (world record of 574.8 km/h or 357.2 mph) and ICE records were achieved with specially modified and shortened trainsets, and the Shinkansen (443 km/h or 275 mph, 1996) record was for a test (non-commercial) trainset.

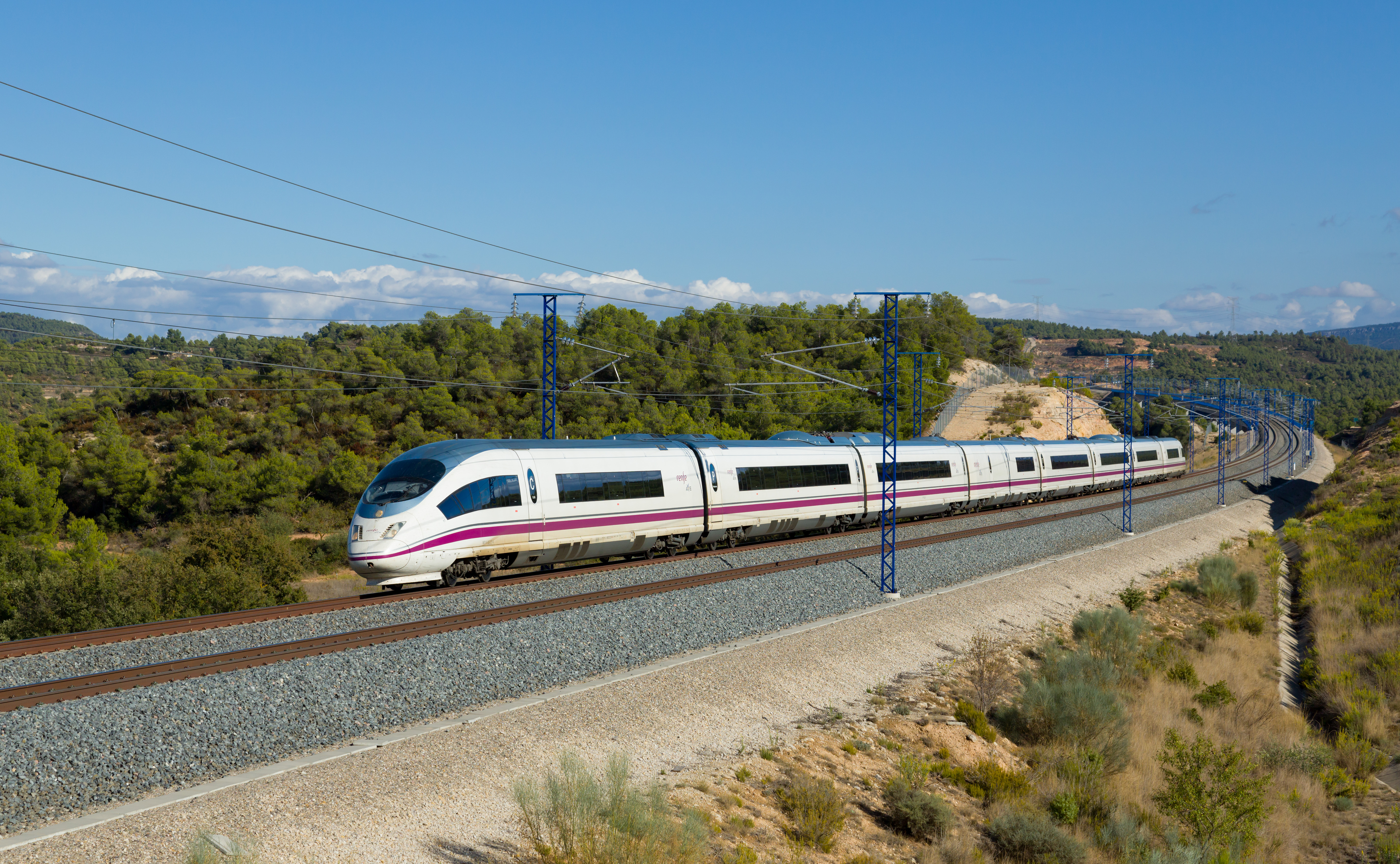
A Spanish Series 103 train, Velaro E

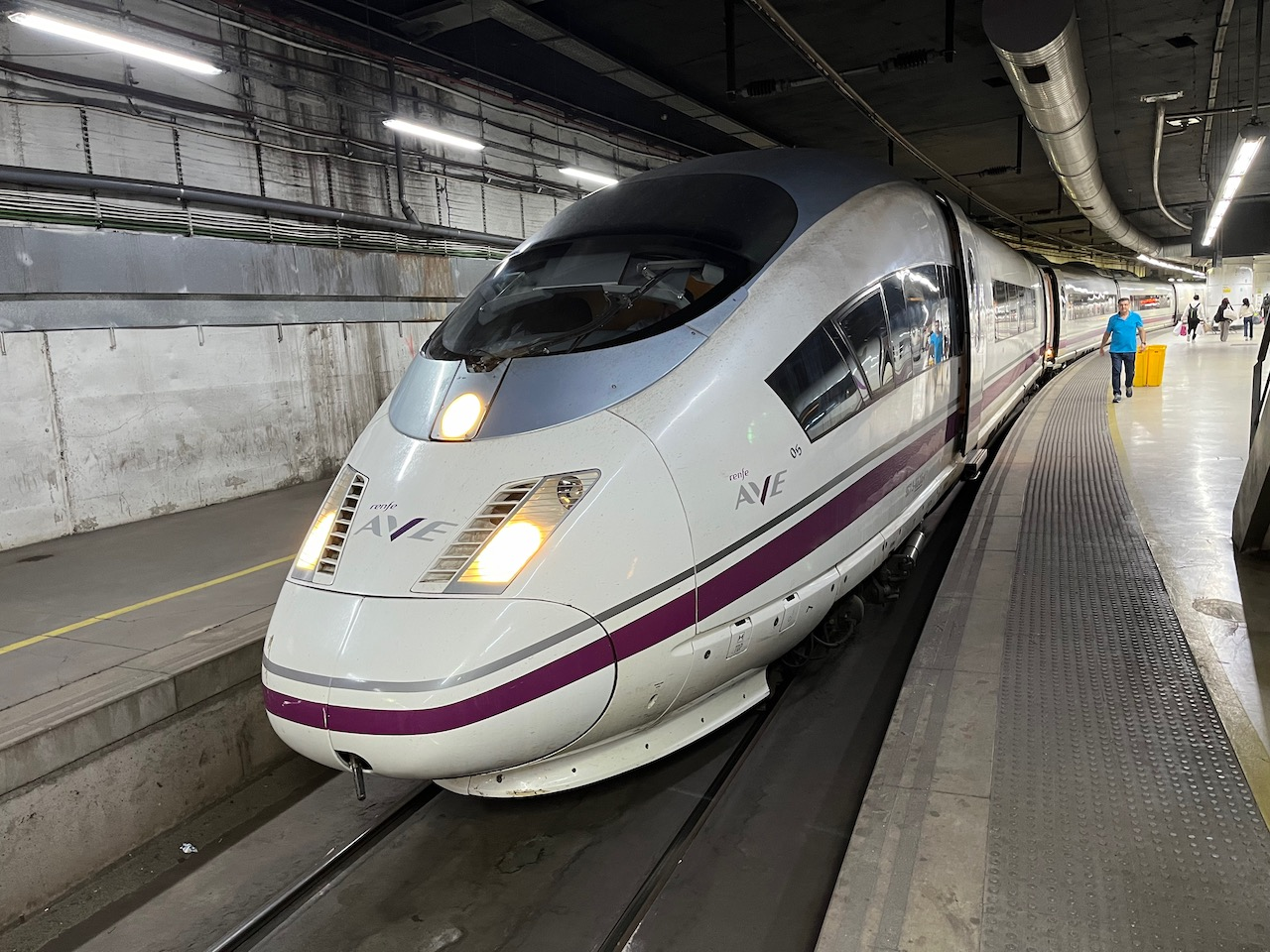
At Barcelona-Sants station

=== Velaro CN (CRH3C) ===
The Velaro CRH3C is a Chinese version of the Velaro. In November 2005, China ordered 60 trains for the Beijing–Tianjin Intercity Railway. The eight-car trains are very similar to Spain's Velaro E, but 300 mm (11.81 in) wider to fit in almost 50% more seats in a 2 plus 3 layout. In the CRH3C version, a 200-metre-long Velaro train will seat 600 passengers. These trains were manufactured jointly by Siemens in Germany and CNR Tangshan in China. The first Chinese-built CRH3C was unveiled on 11 April 2008.

CRH3C reached a top speed of 394.3 km/h (245.0 mph) during a test on the Beijing to Tianjin high-speed railway on 24 June 2008.

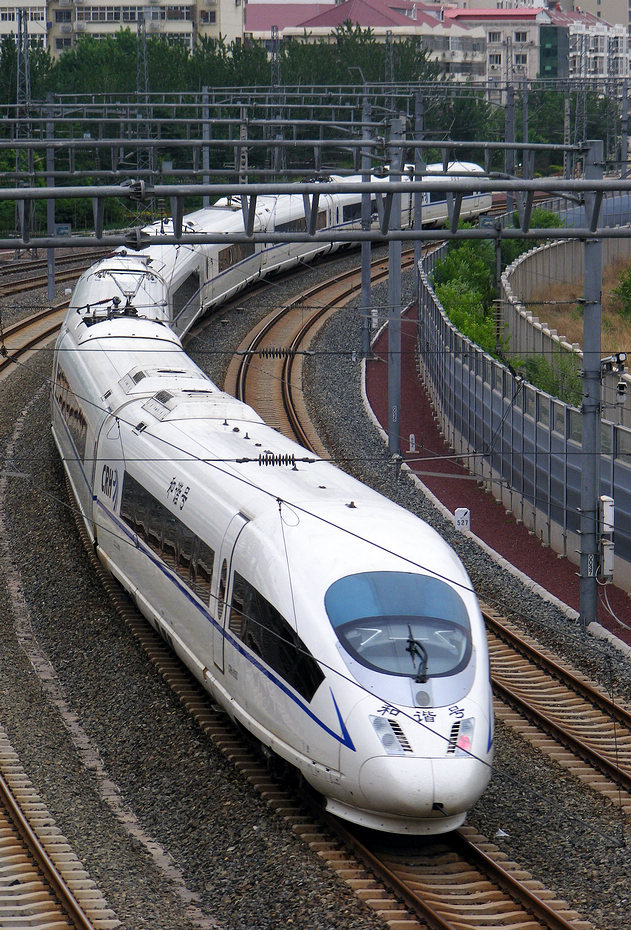
A Velaro CRH3C in China

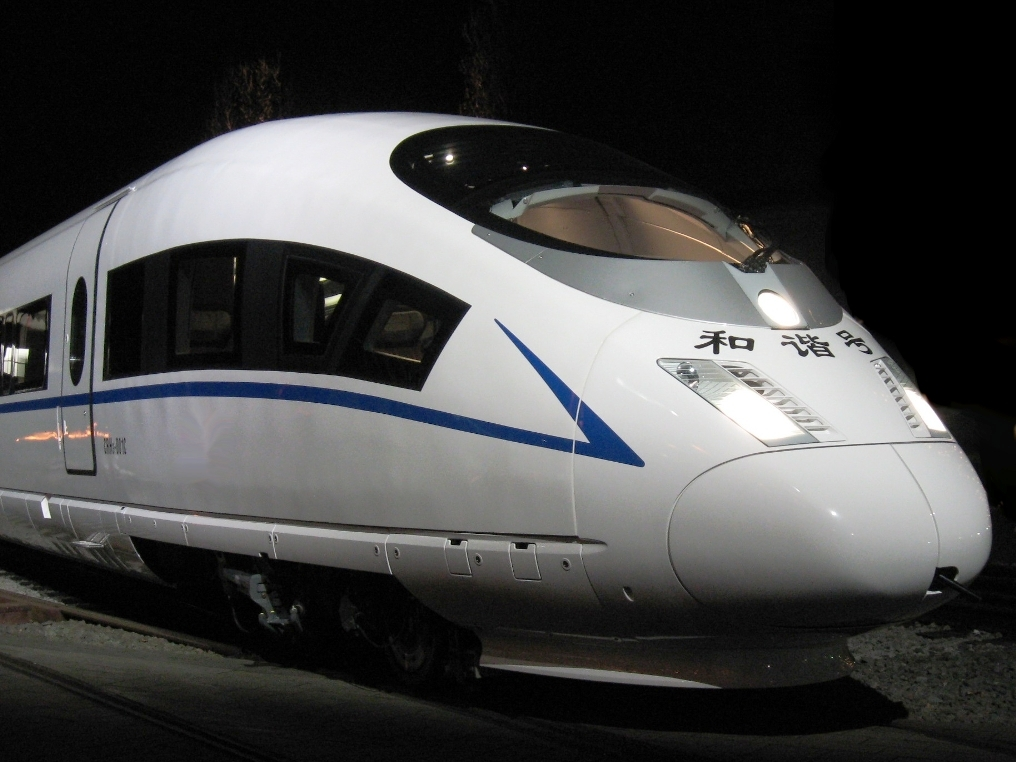
Close-up of the sleeker nose section typical for earlier Velaro trains

=== Velaro RUS (RZD Sapsan) ===
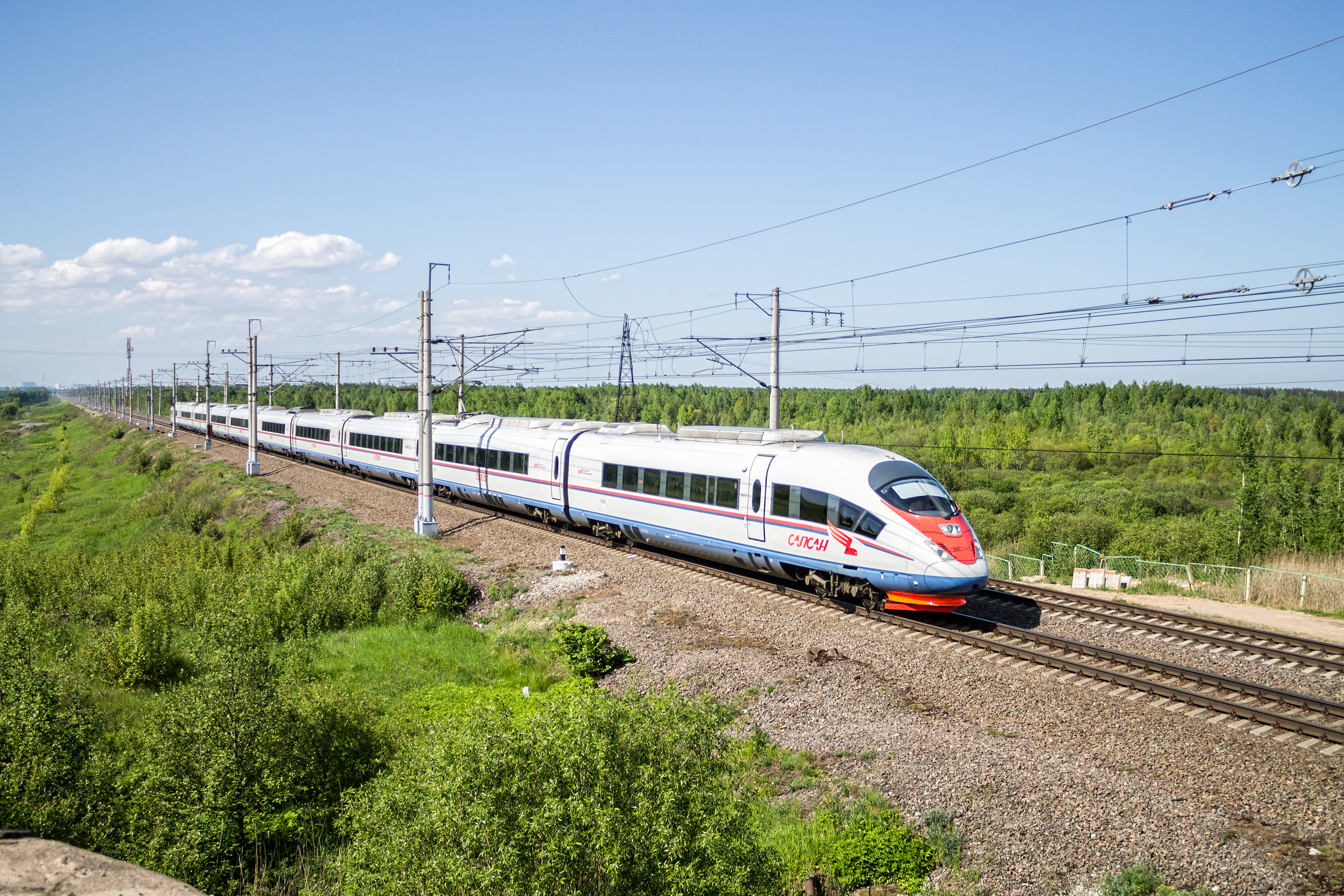
Siemens Velaro RUS EVS2

The Velaro RUS is part of the Velaro family built for Russia. On 19 May 2006, Siemens announced an order from Russian Railways for eight Velaro RUS high-speed trains including a 30-year service contract. The contract is in total worth €600 million. The trains, connecting Moscow with Saint Petersburg, and later also Saint Petersburg and Nizhny Novgorod (the service was temporarily discontinued from 1 June 2015 till 1 March 2018) at a speed of up to 250 km/h (155 mph), are based on the ICE3 train standard but with bodies widened by 33 cm (13 in) to 3.265 m (10 ft 8 1/2 in) to take advantage of Russia's wide loading gauge. They are also built to the 1,520 mm (4 ft 11 27/32 in) Russian track gauge, unlike other Velaro EMUs, which are standard gauge.

Four of the trains are for both 3 kV DC and 25 kV 50 Hz AC operation. The total length of each ten-car train is 250 m (820 ft 3 in), carrying up to 600 passengers.

Development and construction were carried out at Erlangen and Krefeld in Germany. Single-voltage EVS1 (3 kV DC) trains entered passenger service at the end of 2009 on the Moscow–St Petersburg route, and the dual-system EVS2 trains entered service on the Nizhniy Novgorod route in 2010.

It set a record for the fastest train in Russia on 2 May 2009, travelling at 281 km/h (175 mph) and on 7 May 2009, travelling at 290 km/h (180 mph).

On 19 December 2011 an order for an additional eight sets was signed to facilitate an increased number of services on existing lines and the expansion of new service elsewhere in the system.

=== Velaro D (DB Class 407 / ICE 3MS) ===
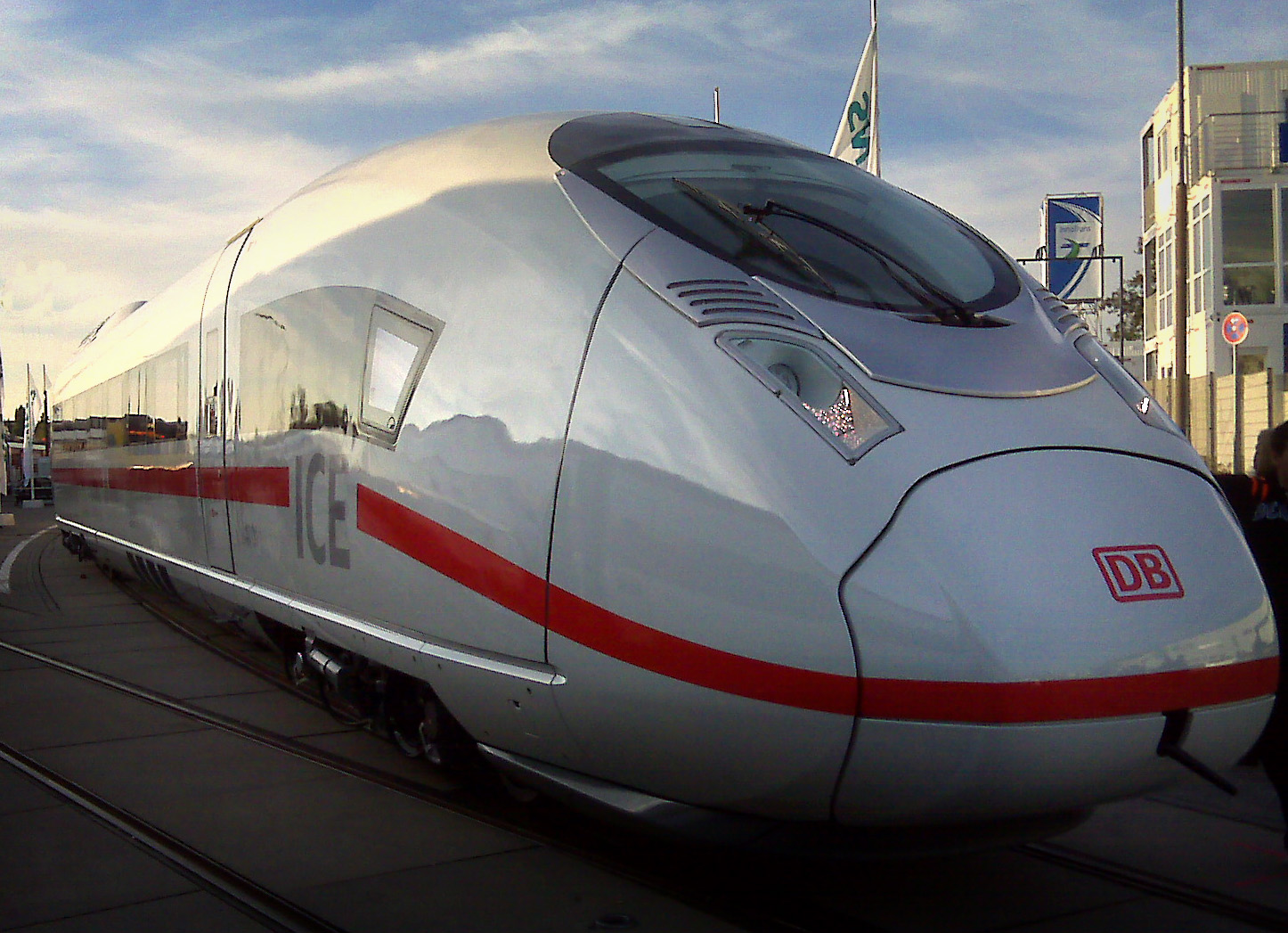
Siemens Velaro D at InnoTrans 2010, after handover of first train to DB. Note the wider nose section compared to earlier Velaro models.

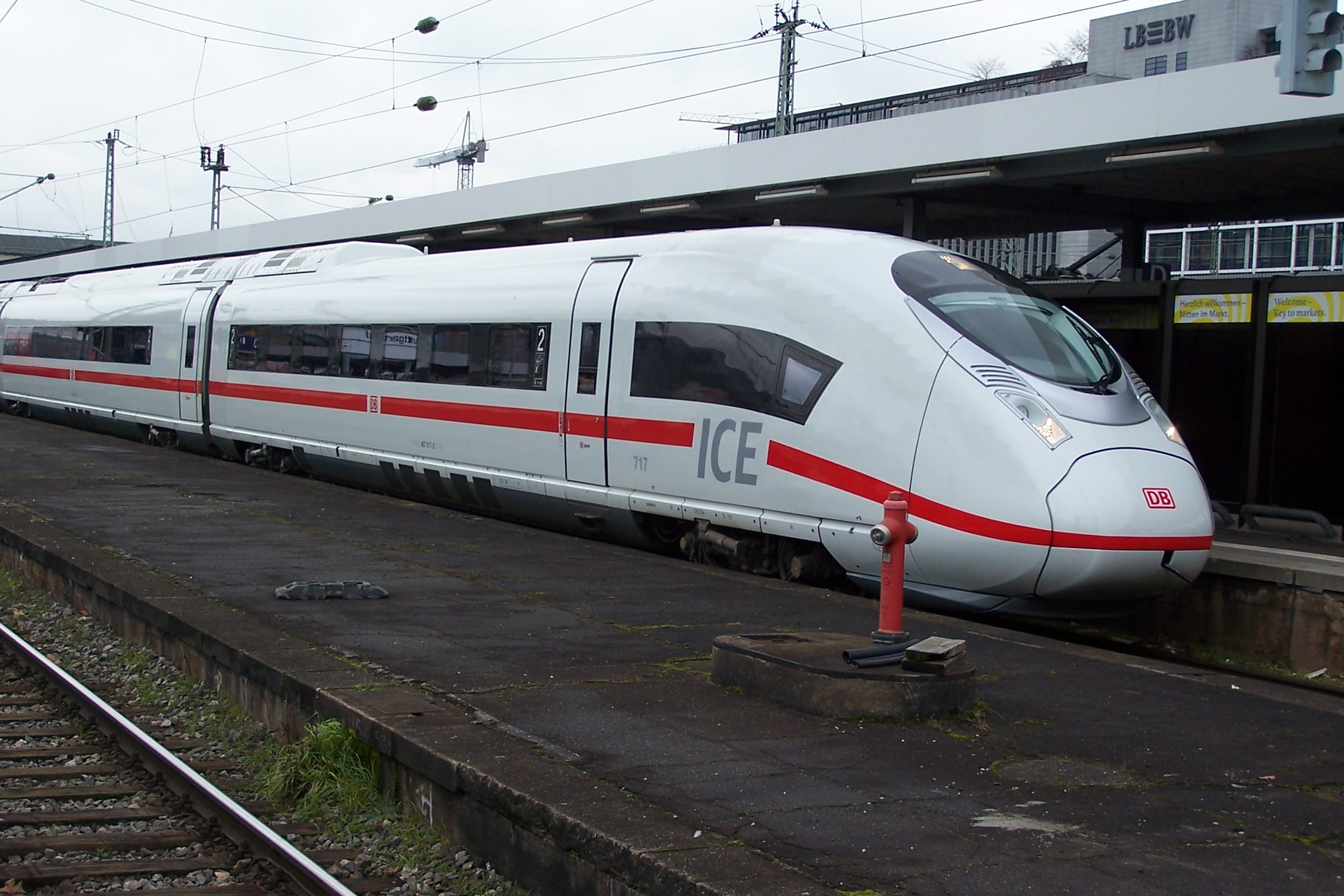
Siemens Velaro D at Stuttgart Hauptbahnhof

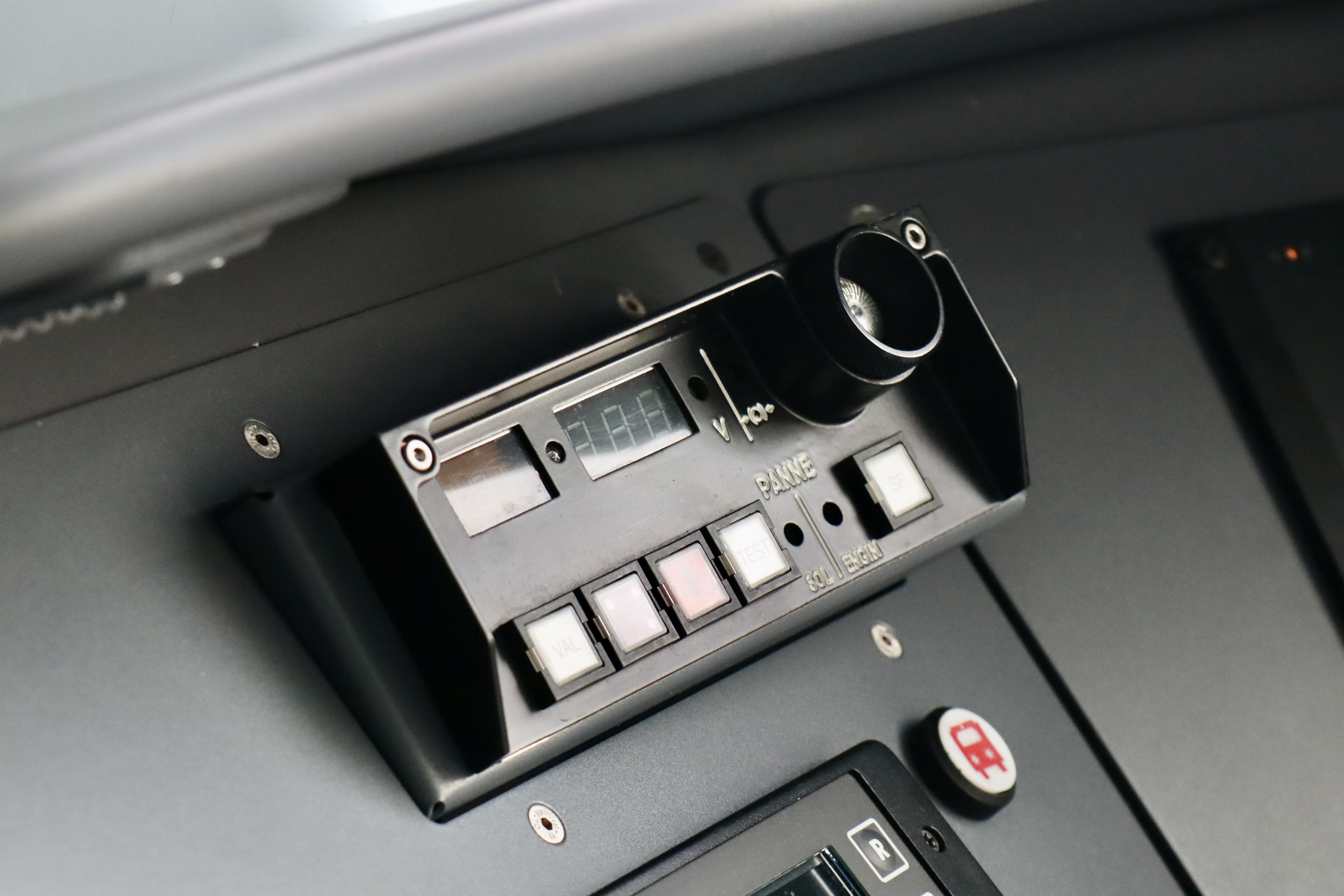
The French signaling system KVB interface on the Velaro D

The Velaro D is specifically designed for Deutsche Bahn international services from Germany. Designated DB's Class 407, it is designed to run at speeds up to 320 km/h (200 mph) and comply with Technical Specifications for Interoperability and enhanced crashworthiness requirements. There are fire-proof equipment rooms and fire doors between cars. The Velaro D is designed to be quieter and more reliable than the ICE 3 (Class 403/406).

The train is also expected to use up to 20% less energy than previous versions of ICE. This is achieved in part by improved body styling. The Class 407 has 460 seats: 111 in first class, 333 in second class and 16 in the bistro car. This is 37 more seats than on Class 403/406 train sets, even though the seat pitch is unchanged. This is achieved by putting the traction equipment in compartments at either end of the train instead of hiding it behind panels the length of the train. This change removes the panorama lounges, found on older trainsets, which provide passengers in the end cars with a cab view. The passenger seating is all open-plan and there are no compartments.

The eight-coach Class 407 trains can couple up and work with their Class 403 and Class 406 predecessors. Eight of the 16 bogies per train are powered, and there are four independent sets of traction equipment per train. Should two of them break down, the train can still operate. For full international flexibility across Europe, it can function on any of four voltages. The fleet is based in Frankfurt.

In December 2008 Deutsche Bahn signed a €500 million order for 15 trainsets. The train's production stages were presented to the press in Krefeld on 28 April 2010, and three completed cars were displayed by Siemens on 22 September 2010 at InnoTrans. In June 2011, Deutsche Bahn ordered an additional Velaro D set (increasing the total to 16) to replace a Class 406 set damaged in an accident in August 2010.

The Velaro D was meant to enter into service in December 2011 on services from Frankfurt to southern France via the new LGV Rhin-Rhône, and subsequently within Germany and on other international services to France, Belgium, Switzerland and the Netherlands. Due to a series of delays in manufacturing and certification, no Velaro D trainsets were in service as of November 2012 and there was no schedule for their delivery. Only in December 2013 the first four trains delivered to DB were certified for domestic operation as multiple units and started passenger service. Four more trains were due to be delivered in spring 2014, whereas the remainder of eight trains were used for test runs in France and Belgium to gain type approval there.

The specification of the Velaro D allows it to use the Channel Tunnel, enabling DB to use it on the services it planned to operate from London to Amsterdam and Frankfurt. Deutsche Bahn submitted safety documentation for the operation of Velaro D high speed trainsets through the Channel Tunnel to the Intergovernmental Commission in July 2011. It received approval in June 2013 but cancelled plans to operate trains to London.

In 2012 and 2013, Siemens discussed with Deutsche Bahn the delivery of one more Velaro D set, free of charge, as compensation for the delivery and certification delays. This train was originally built for test purposes and features a different propulsion setup, utilizing permanent magnet AC synchronous motors as opposed to the traditional AC asynchronous motors. Siemens stated that this will allow a reduction in the number of propulsion units per train, while still maintaining train performance.

=== Velaro MS (DB Class 408/ICE 3neo) ===
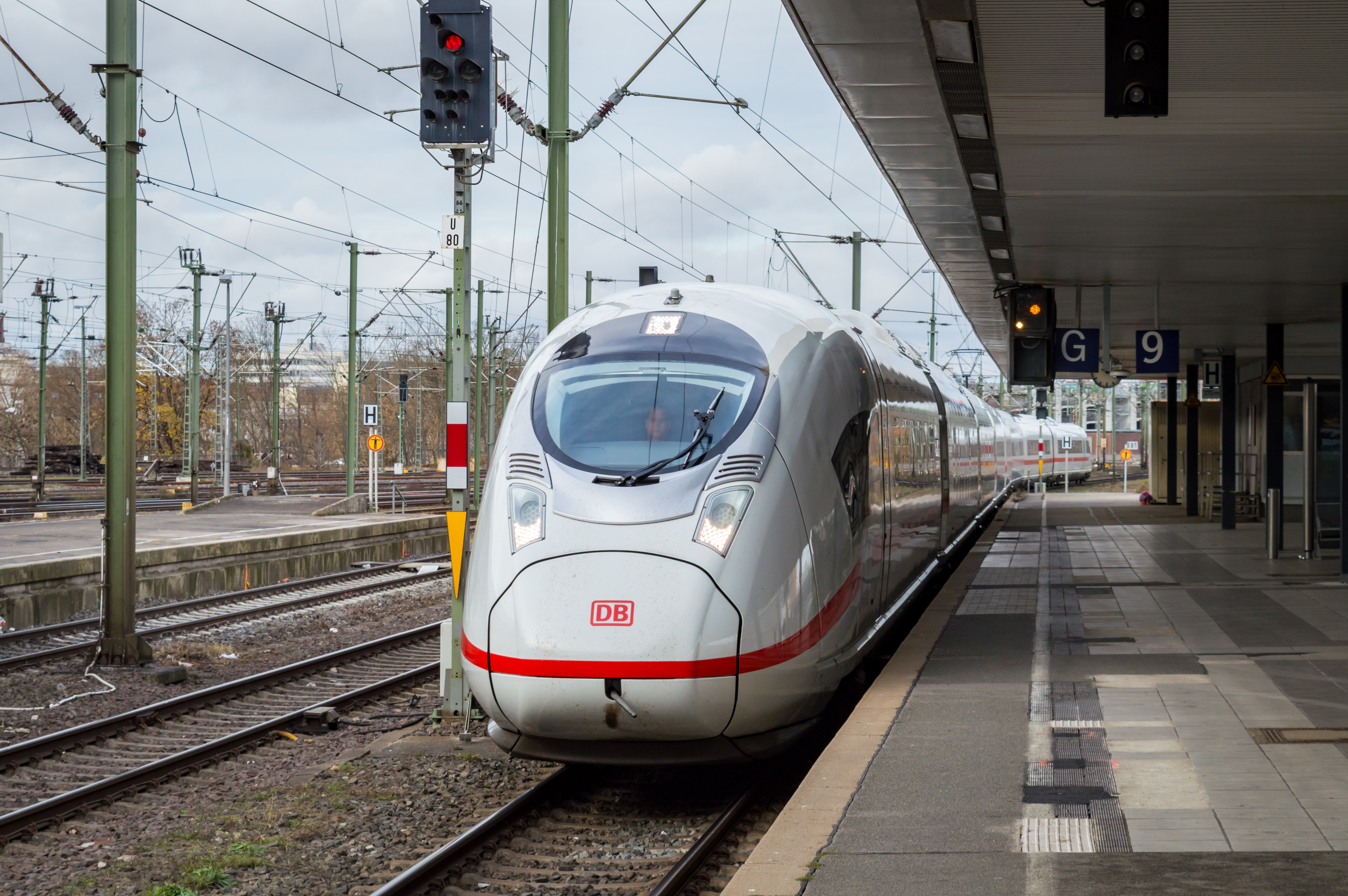
A DB Class 408 Velaro MS at Hannover Hbf.

In 2019, Deutsche Bahn felt the need for further trains able to run at 300 km/h (190 mph) or faster for national and international use. Siemens offered its Velaro Novo, which was under development, and it offered an evolution of the Velaro D, designed for operation at 320 km/h (200 mph) and equipped with multi-system (MS) capability, hence labelled Velaro MS. Demanding a service-proven model, Deutsche Bahn ordered 30 Velaro MS for delivery starting in 2022.

The first of these trains was completed in late 2021 and presented to the public in February 2022, marketed as ICE 3neo by Deutsche Bahn and bearing the DB class number 408. At the same time, the order was increased by 43 trainsets, with all 73 trains planned to have entered service by early 2029. In May 2023, the order was increased by another 17 units, bringing the total number to 90.

The first class 408 unit entered revenue service in December 2022. International service started in June 2024, seeing the ICE 3neo replacing class 406 units on services to both Belgium and The Netherlands.

In October 2023, a new seating for the Deutsche Bahn long-distance fleet debuted on a class 408 train with line number 17. All subsequent units will be tout the redesigned seating. Like the Velaro D Class 407, the class 408 does not feature the panorama lounges behind the drivers cab as found in the early ICE 3 models class 403 and 406.

=== Velaro e320 (Eurostar) ===
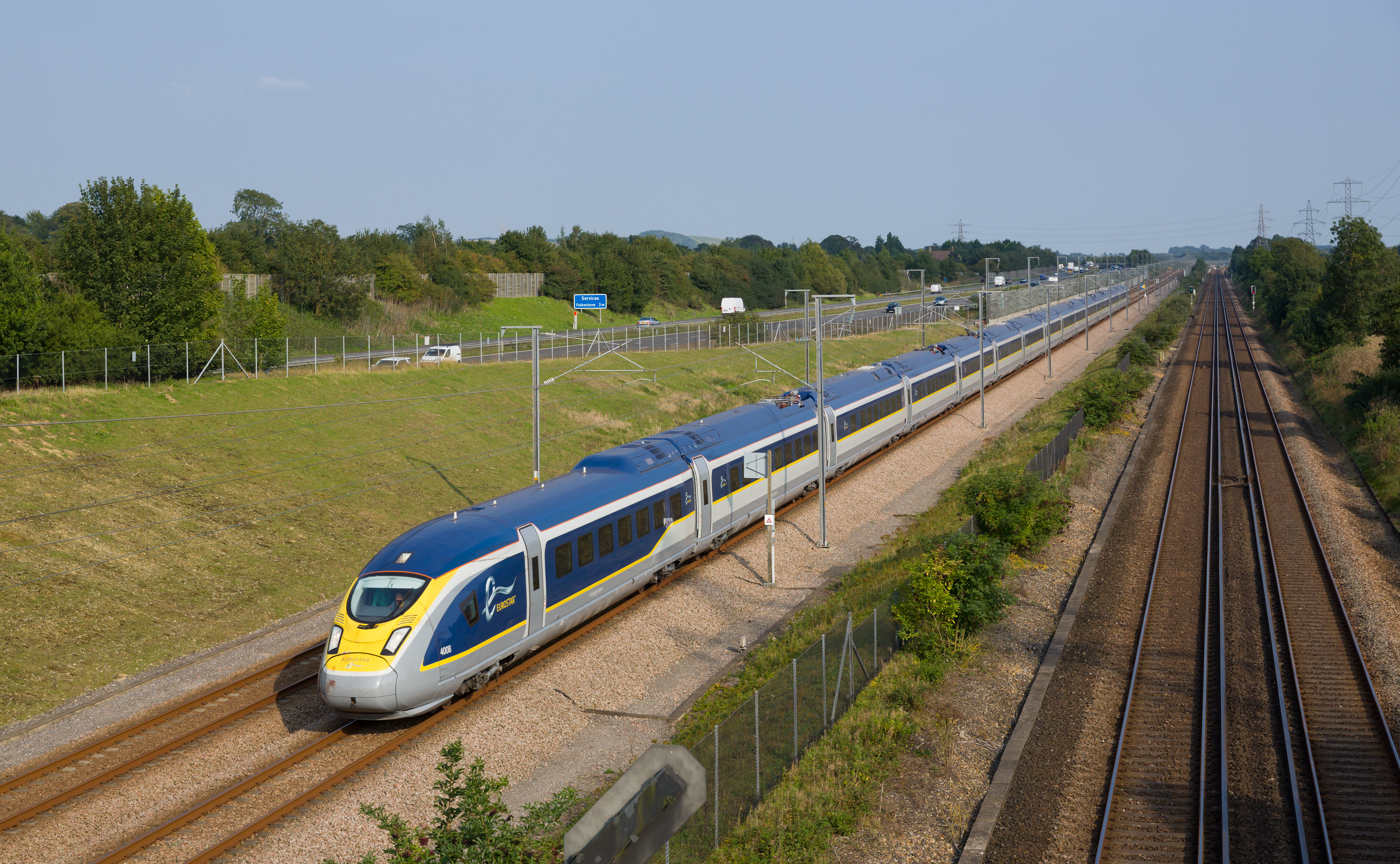
Eurostar e320 near Sellindge, Kent, England. Its 16-car configuration is among the longest of Velaros in service.

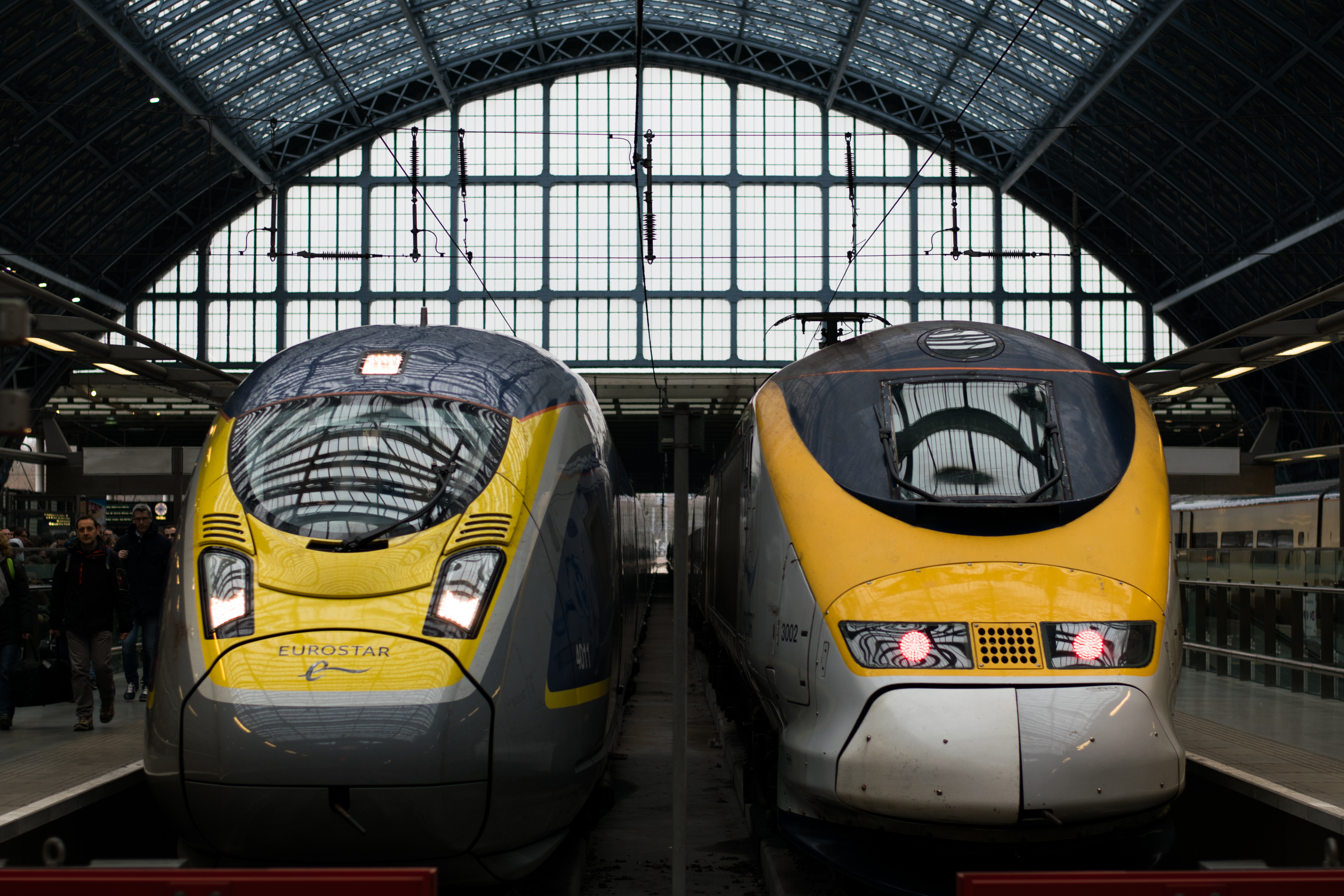
A Eurostar e320 (left), also designated as British Rail Class 374, alongside a TGV TMST, or Class 373 (right).

On 7 October 2010, it was reported that Eurostar had selected Siemens as preferred bidder to supply ten Velaro e320 trainsets at a cost of €600 million (and a total investment of more than £700 million with the refurbishment of the existing fleet included) to operate an expanded route network, including services from London to Cologne and Amsterdam. These are sixteen-car, 400-metre (1,312 ft 4 in) long trainsets built to meet current Channel Tunnel regulations, and are not the same as the Velaro D sets which Deutsche Bahn propose to operate services between Germany and London. The top speed is 320 km/h (200 mph) they have 902 seats, unlike the current Eurostar fleet manufactured by the French Alstom, which has a top speed of 300 km/h (190 mph) and a seating capacity of 750. Total traction power is rated at 16 MW (21,000 hp; 22,000 PS). On the British system they are classified as Class 374 units.

=== Velaro TR (TCDD HT80000) ===
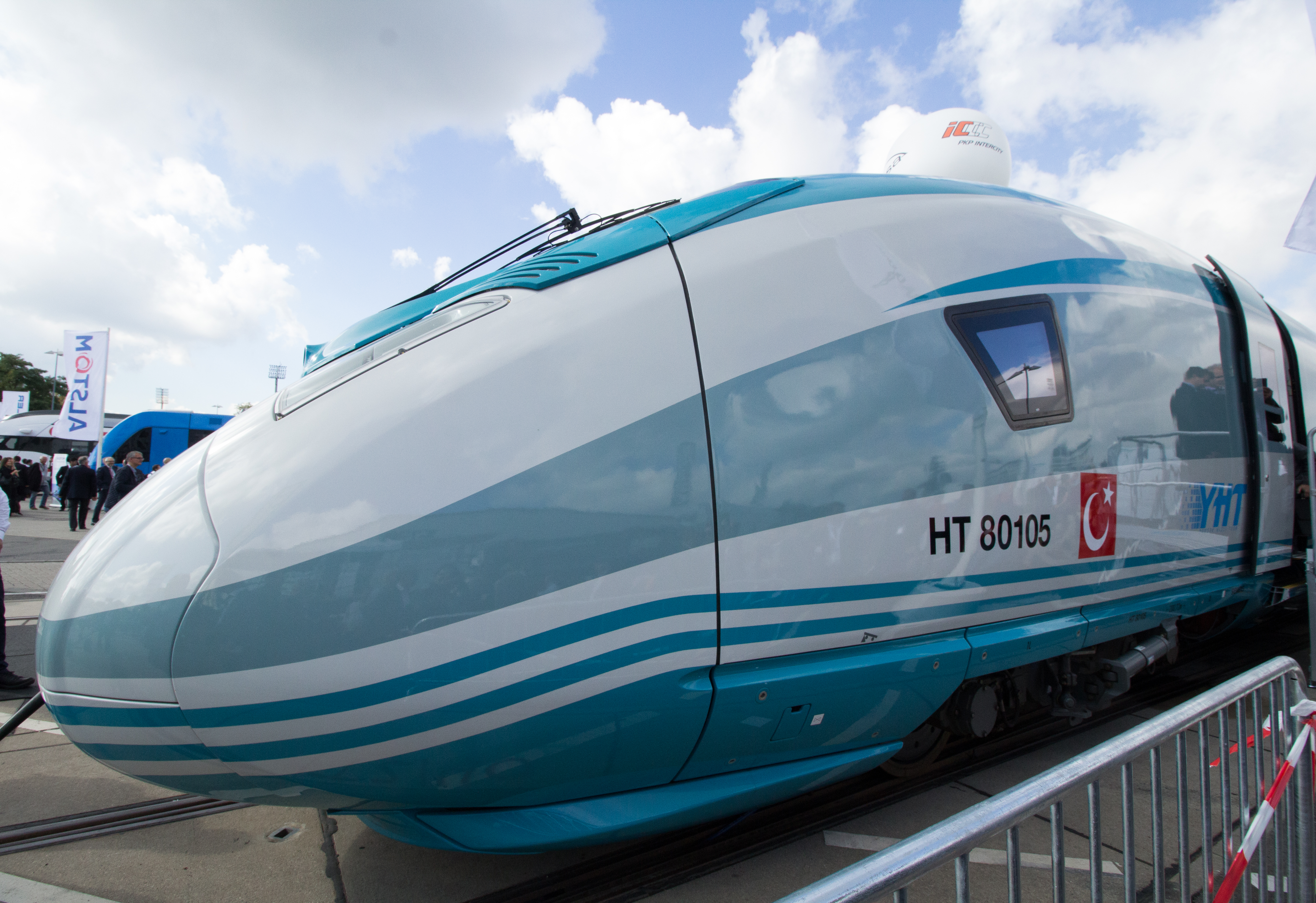
A Turkish HT80000 unit at InnoTrans 2016

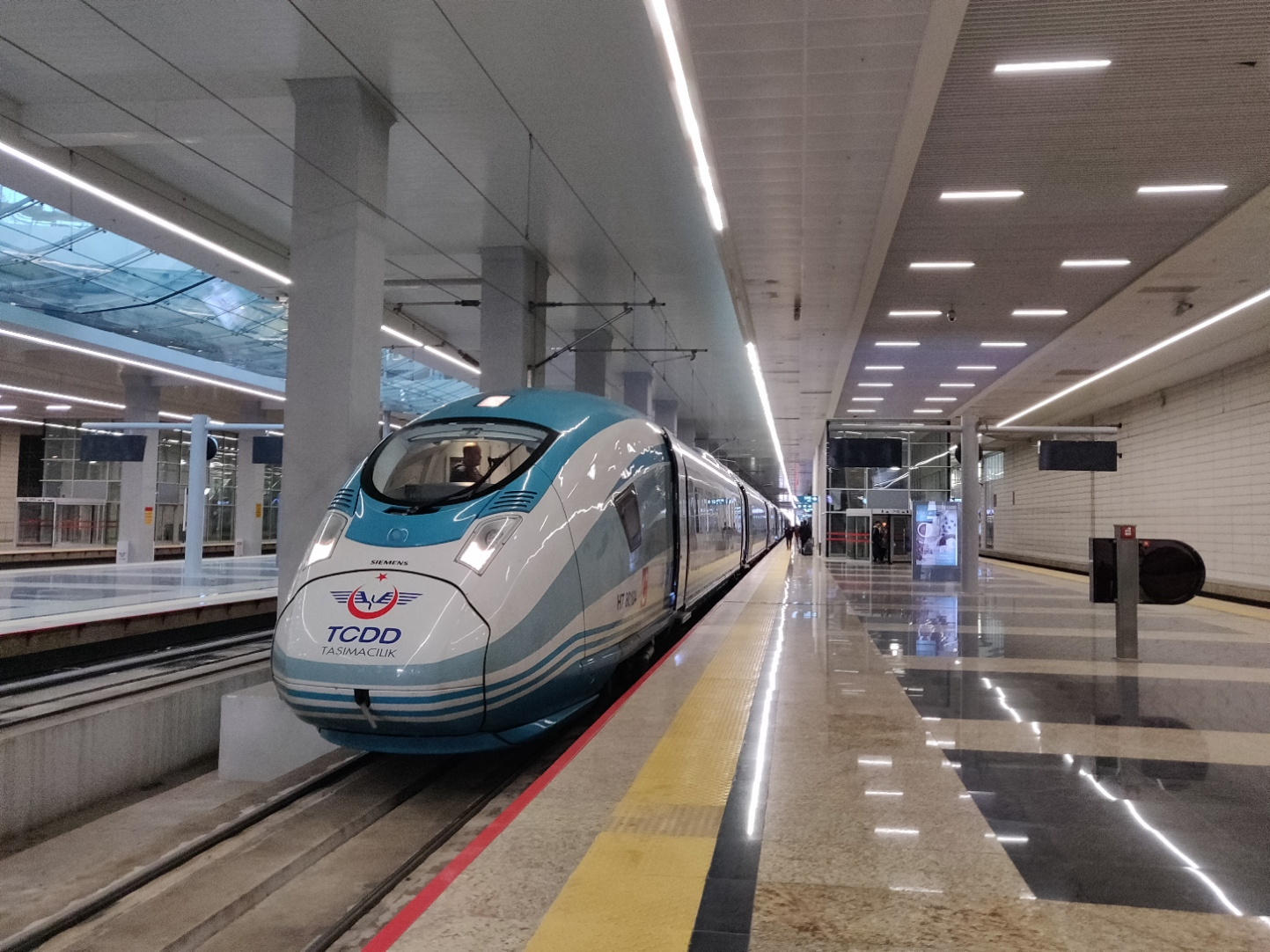
In revenue service at the ATG terminal in Ankara

The Velaro TR is a Velaro D derived eight-car standard gauge high-speed train for the Turkish State Railways (TCDD). The eight cars, totalling a length of 200 m (656 ft 2 in), can accommodate 519 passengers and reach a top speed of 300 km/h (190 mph). 25 kV 50 Hz AC power the train with a total of 8 MW.

In 2013, TCDD concluded four contracts with Siemens for the acquisition of 19 units in total (one unit for the first, six for the second, ten for the third and two for the last contract) with a combined value of €685 million, excluding the last two sets. Furthermore, Siemens would provide 7 years of maintenance and cleaning for the first 7 sets, and also provide a simulator. For the remaining 12 sets Siemens would provide 3 years of maintenance and cleaning. The Velaros are to be deployed on the Turkish high-speed railway network. The first Siemens Velaro (the only Velaro D type train of TCDD, code numbered HT80001) entered service on 23 May 2015 between Ankara-Konya. The second Velaro of TCDD, which is the first Velaro TR type train, with the code number HT80101 (this type of train was involved an accident in Ankara) arrived in Ankara on 17 February 2016. The last Velaro TR (HT80118) arrived in Turkey in 2021.

Unlike the traditional white - red - dark blue color scheme used on the TCDD HT65000 high-speed trains, a white - turquoise - grey color scheme has been selected for the livery of TCDD's Velaro trains.

=== Velaro Egypt ===
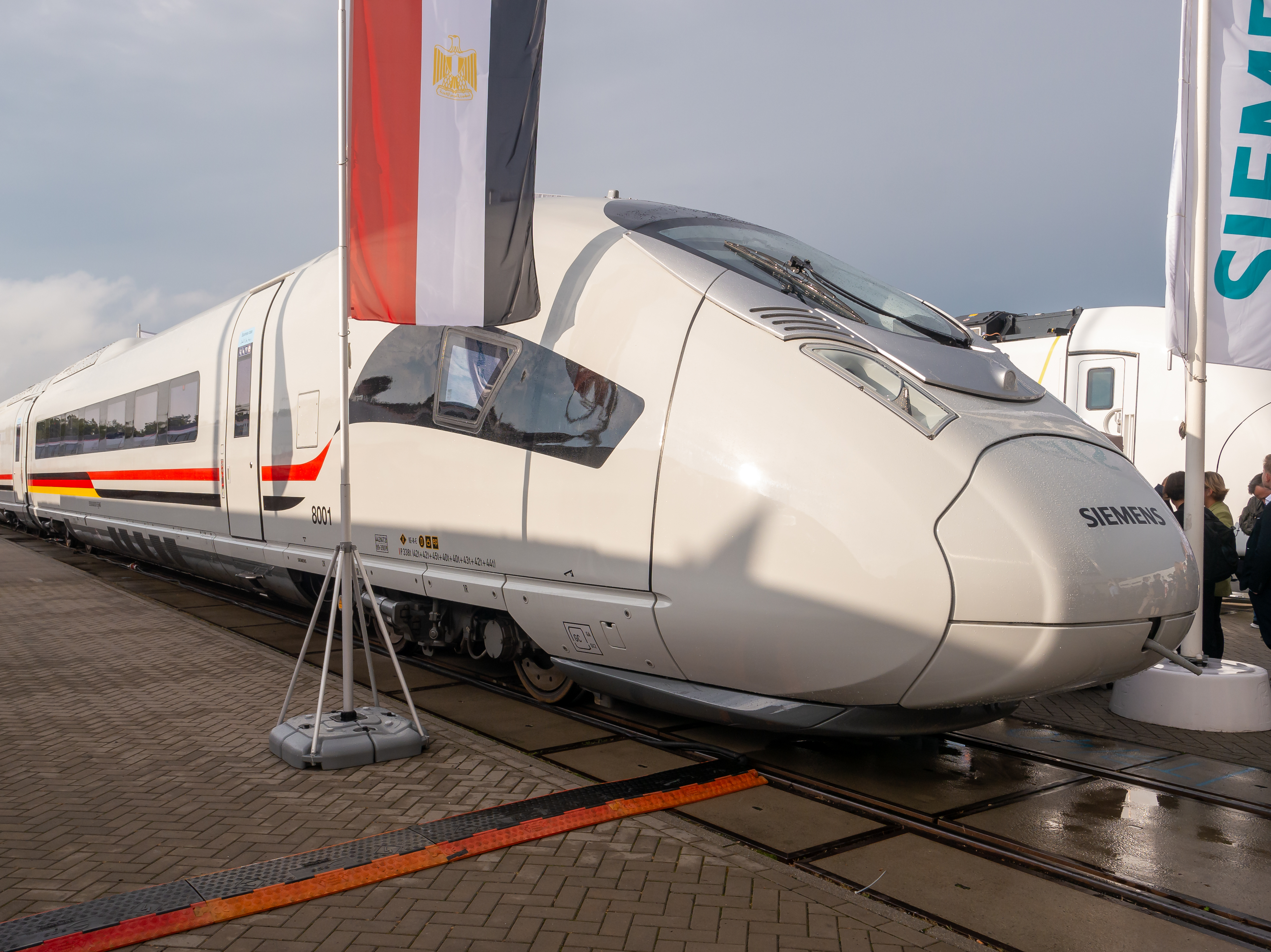
Siemens Velaro EGY at InnoTrans 2024

In May 2022 it was announced that Egyptian National Railways had ordered 41 Velaro eight-car sets, amongst other railway equipment, for a 2,000 km (1,243 mi) railway development. In May 2024, the first of the Velaro EGY high speed trainsets was undergoing dynamic testing at the Wegberg-Wildenrath circuit in Germany ahead of delivery later the year.

=== Velaro Novo ===
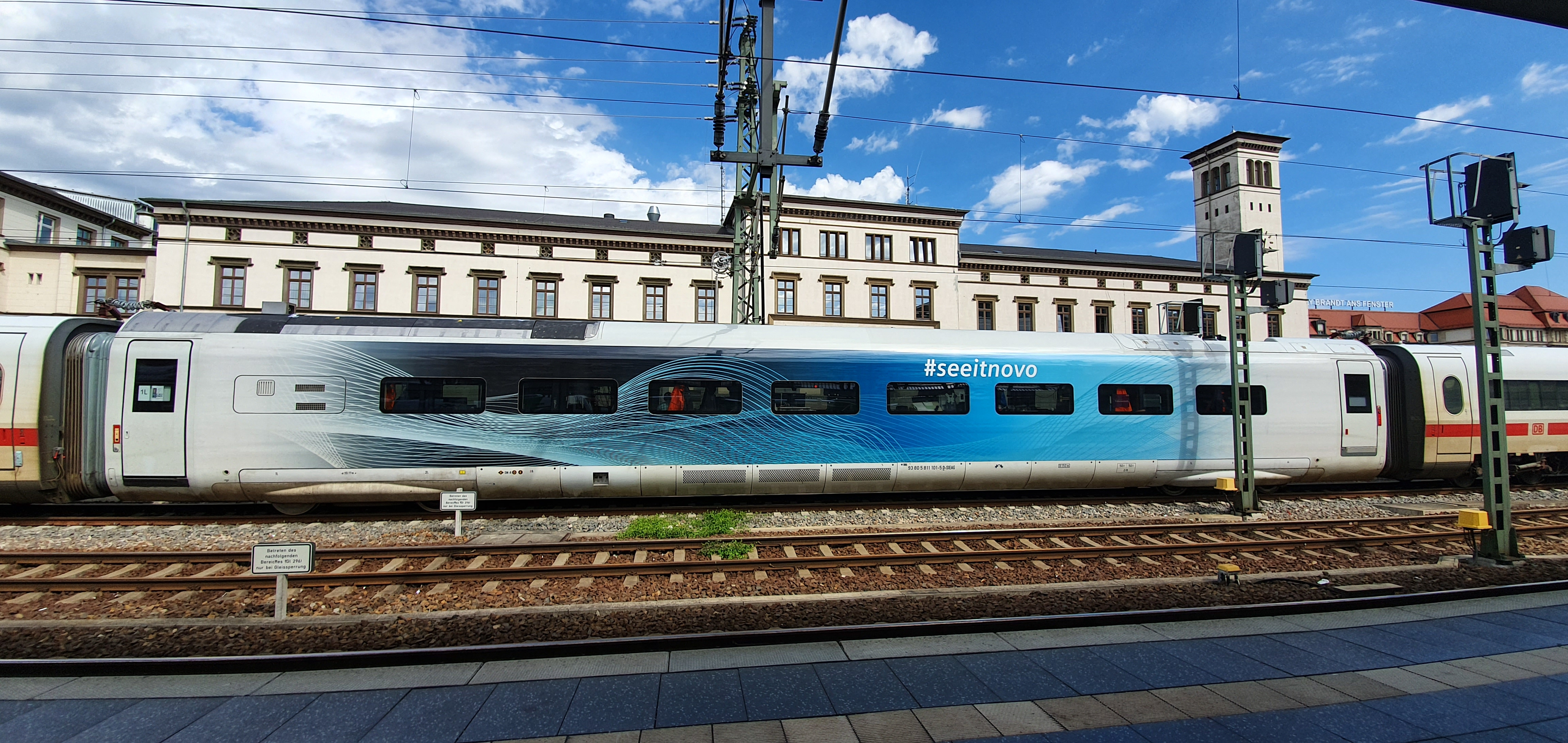
Velaro Novo prototype car

The Velaro Novo is Siemens's concept for the next generation of high speed trains, announced in June 2018. It would be lighter and more efficient than previous designs, with a top speed of 360 km/h (225 mph). The company claims to achieve these improvements via lightweight construction techniques and reduced aerodynamic drag by fully covered, inside bearing bogies. By 2024, no full trainset had yet been produced except for one prototype car that has been running as part of a Deutsche Bahn ICE-S test train since April 2018.

Siemens offers an American-built version of the Velaro Novo on the US market called the American Pioneer 220 (AP220). In May 2024, Siemens announced that Brightline had selected them to produce ten seven-car trainsets for their Rancho Cucamonga–Las Vegas route (Brightline West) that is planned for completion in 2029. On 29 October 2026, California High-Speed Rail ordered three AP220 trainsets for its initial operating segment. Siemens has broken ground on a new facility in Horseheads, New York, to assist with assembly of the trainsets.

VinSpeed High-Speed Rail Investment and Development Joint Stock Company (a member of Vingroup) and Siemens Mobility GmbH have announced the signing of a turnkey contract for the Hanoi–Quang Ninh and Ben Thanh–Can Gio high-speed rail lines. Valued at up to 1 billion euros, the contract builds on the Comprehensive Strategic Cooperation and Technology Transfer Agreement signed by the two parties in December 2025, translating the strategic partnership between VinSpeed and Siemens Mobility into concrete projects and implementation. Under the contract, VinSpeed will be responsible for project development, track construction and civil works. Siemens Mobility will serve as the technology partner, providing advanced rail systems and the necessary technical expertise. Specifically, Siemens Mobility will deliver 10 Velaro Novo trains for two rail lines, including the 121-km Hanoi - Quang Ninh line with four stations and the 54-km Ben Thanh - Can Gio line with two stations, together with communications and electrification. This will be executed in phases.

== Specifications ==
The Velaro platform has been customized for each variant according to operational needs:

Specifications of Velaro variants
	ES	CN	RUS	D	E320	TR	MS	EGY	AP220
	AVE Class 103	CRH3	Sapsan	DB Class 407	BR Class 374	TCDD HT80000	DB Class 408	ENR Class 408	AP220
Operator	Renfe, Spain	China Railway, China	Russian Railways, Russia	Deutsche Bahn, Germany	Eurostar, Western Europe	TCDD Taşımacılık, Turkey	Deutsche Bahn, Germany	Egyptian National Railways, Egypt	Brightline West, California High-Speed Rail, U.S.
Date of initial order (service entry)	2001 (2007)	2005 (2008)	2006 (2009)	2008 (2013)	2010 (2015)	2013 (2015)	2019 (2022)	2022 (?)	2024 (2030)
Length	200 m (660 ft), 8 cars with 460 seats	200 m (660 ft), 8 cars with 601 seats	250 m (820 ft), 10 cars with 604 seats	200 m (660 ft), 8 cars with 460 seats	400 m (1,300 ft), 16 cars with 902 seats	200 m (660 ft), 8 cars with 516 seats	200 m (660 ft), 8 cars with 439 seats		202 m (664 ft), 7 cars with 450+ seats
Weight	425 t	447 t	667 t	454 t		454 t	460 t		
Maximum speed	350 km/h (220 mph)	380 km/h (240 mph)	250 km/h (160 mph)	320 km/h (200 mph)	320 km/h (200 mph)	320 km/h (200 mph)	320 km/h (200 mph)		350 km/h (220 mph)
Power output	8,800 kW (11,800 hp)	8,800 kW (11,800 hp), 18,400 kW (24,700 hp) (CRH380BL)	8,000 kW (10,728 hp)	8,000 kW (10,728 hp)	16,000 kW (21,000 hp)	8,000 kW (10,728 hp)			8,200 kW (11,000 hp)
Tractive effort	283 kN (64,000 lb_{f})	300 kN (67,000 lb_{f}), 515 kN (116,000 lb_{f}) (CRH380BL)	328 kN (74,000 lb_{f})	300 kN (67,000 lb_{f})					
Power systems	25 kV 50 Hz AC	25 kV 50 Hz AC	3 kV DC, 25 kV 50 Hz AC	25 kV 50 Hz AC, 15 kV, 16.7 Hz AC, 3 kV, 1.5 kV DC	25 kV 50 Hz AC, 15 kV, 16.7 Hz AC, 3 kV, 1.5 kV DC	25 kV 50 Hz AC	25 kV 50 Hz AC, 15 kV, 16.7 Hz AC, 3 kV, 1.5 kV DC		25 kV 60 Hz AC

== Livery illustrations ==
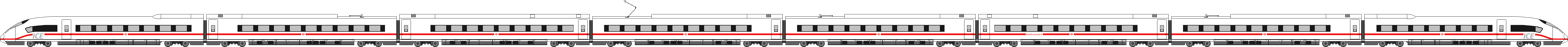
Velaro D in Deutsche Bahn livery
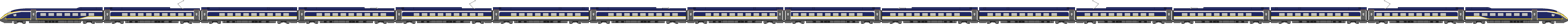
Velaro E320 in Eurostar livery

== See also ==
- Bombardier Zefiro
- Alstom AGV
- CAF Oaris
- List of high-speed trains
