= Sagrera railway station =

Railway station in Barcelona, Spain

Barcelona Sagrera
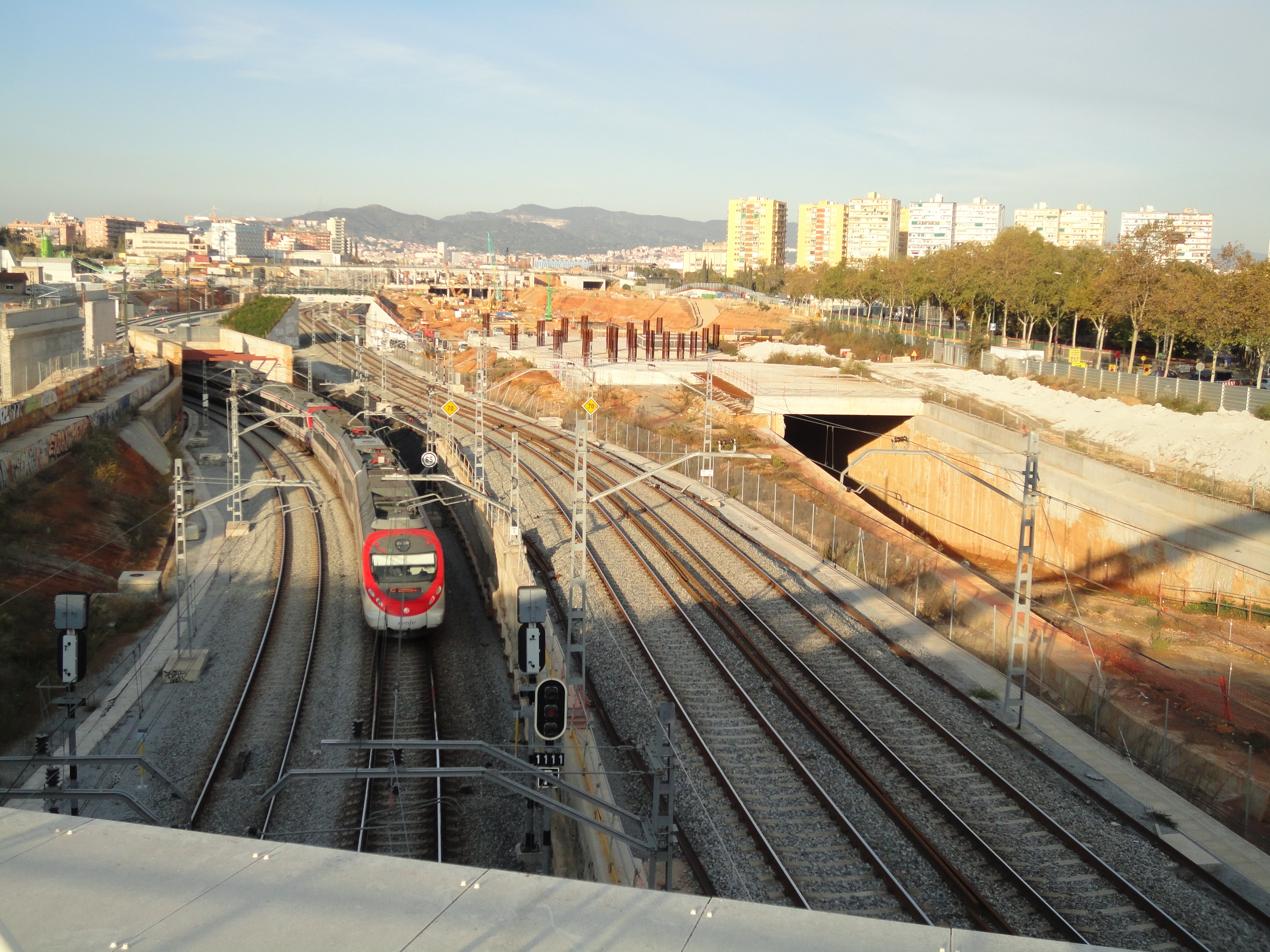
- Overview of the station's construction site from the Bac de Roda Bridge, to the south of the future station, looking north, in 2012.

General information
- Location: Carrer del Pont del Treball Digne; 08027 Barcelona; Catalonia; Spain
- Coordinates: 41°25′18″N 2°11′37″E
- Owner: Adif
- Operator: Adif
- Lines: Madrid–Barcelona–Figueres HSR; Barcelona–Cerbère; Barcelona–Mataró–Maçanet-Massanes
- Platforms: 9 island platforms (5 on the upper floor and 4 on the lower floor)
- Tracks: 18 (10 in standard gauge and 8 in Iberian gauge)
- Train operators: Renfe Operadora; SNCF
- Connections: Barcelona Metro: Adjacent bus station; Urban and interurban buses

Construction
- Structure type: Underground
- Platform levels: 2 (one for the standard gauge tracks and the other for the Iberian gauge ones)
- Parking: Yes
- Accessible: Yes
- Architect: Frank Gehry (and others)

Other information
- Status: Under construction
- Station code: TBA
- Fare zone: 1 (ATM Àrea de Barcelona and Rodalies de Catalunya's Barcelona commuter rail service)
- Website: www.barcelonasagrera.com

History
- Opening: Unknown

Passengers
- 100 million (once fully operational)
Location
- Location within Barcelona

Sagrera railway station (Catalan: Estació de la Sagrera, Spanish: Estación de la Sagrera) is a major through station under construction in the Barcelona districts of Sant Andreu and Sant Martí, in Catalonia, Spain. It is intended to serve as the central station for northern and eastern Barcelona, with Sants serving as the central station for southern and western Barcelona. It will add a high-speed hub to the current two stations on the Madrid–Barcelona high-speed rail line, El Prat de Llobregat and Sants. The new station will be on the Perpignan–Barcelona high-speed rail line and additionally on the conventional Barcelona–Cerbère and Barcelona–Mataró–Maçanet-Massanes railways. Once fully completed, it will be a major public transport hub, with dedicated stations on Barcelona Metro lines 4 and 9/10, as well as a bus station. The complex will be fully underground excepting for the station building, with two levels of platforms, accounting for a total of 18 railway tracks.

The new station is part of a larger urban redevelopment project along the corridor formed by the railways accessing Barcelona from the north-east, which divides the districts of Sant Andreu and Sant Martí. This project includes the rebuilding of Sant Andreu Comtal railway station, to the north of Sagrera, and the construction of a 3.7-kilometre-long (2.3 mi) linear artificial park over the railways running on the corridor, which will be put underground. At an estimated cost of €2 billion, the project is funded and managed by Barcelona Sagrera Alta Velocitat (BSAV), a public partnership made up of the Spanish Ministry of Public Works and Transport, the Government of Catalonia and the Barcelona City Council.

The idea of a new central station at this location has appeared on local transport projects since the late 1960s. Before being demolished in 2007 with the start of the previous works to the construction of the new station, a major goods station on the Barcelona–Cerbère railway, built between 1918 and 1922, had operated at the location. The groundbreaking ceremony for the new station took place on 21 June 2010, when the completion date was set for 2016. In July 2011, a 1,100 m^{2} (12,000 sq ft) Roman villa was found due to the station construction works. The Spanish Ministry of Public Works and Transport and the City Council announced in July 2013 that they had reached an agreement to modify the original project in order to reduce its cost. In June 2016, it was disclosed that the station works have remained suspended since early 2014 due to a corruption scandal involving one of the companies carrying out the works. After the works were resumed, the new station is now expected to open to AVE and local trains by 2028.

== Barcelona Metro stations ==
Sagrera | TAV

General information
- Location: Carrer del Pont del Treball Digne; 08027 Barcelona; Catalonia; Spain
- System: TMB rapid transit station complex
- Owner: Government of Catalonia
- Operator: Transports Metropolitans de Barcelona (TMB)
- Lines: Barcelona Metro line 4; Barcelona Metro line 9
- Platforms: : 1 split platform; : 1 split platform
- Tracks: : 2; : 2
- Connections: High-speed, intercity, regional and commuter rail services; Adjacent bus station; Urban and interurban buses

Construction
- Structure type: Underground
- Accessible: Yes

Other information
- Status: Under construction
- Station code: TBA
- Fare zone: 1 (ATM Àrea de Barcelona)

History
- Opening: Unknown

Services
| Preceding station | Metro | Following station |
Projected
| La Sagrera Terminus | L4 Polígon Pratenc | Santander towards Trinitat Nova |
| La Sagrera towards Airport T1 | L9 | Onze de Setembre towards Can Zam |
| La Sagrera towards Polígon Pratenc | L10 | Onze de Setembre towards Gorg |
Location

The future Sagrera railway station will be served by lines 4 and 9/10 of the Barcelona Metro. The metro stations will be located parallel to each other, sharing the same hall, on the Sant Andreu district side, to the north-west of the station building. They will be almost level with the lower level of platforms, which will be served by Rodalies de Catalunya commuter and regional rail services. The metro station complex appears on the construction project as Sagrera | TAV, where TAV stands for Tren d'Alta Velocitat (Catalan for "High-Speed Train").

== See also ==
- Madrid–Barcelona high-speed rail line
- Sants railway station
- Sant Andreu Comtal railway station
- La Sagrera-Meridiana station
- Sagrera Tower
- Tunnel of Provença

== Bibliography ==
- Julià Sort, Jordi (October 2013). Sagrera i la xarxa ferroviària de Barcelona [Sagrera and Barcelona's railway system] (in Catalan). Barcelona: Viena Edicions. ISBN 978-84-8330-740-3.
