= Madrid–Barcelona high-speed rail line =

Railway line connecting Madrid and Barcelona, in Spain

Coordinates: 41.6094°N 0.2207°E

Madrid–Barcelona (- Figueres) high-speed rail line
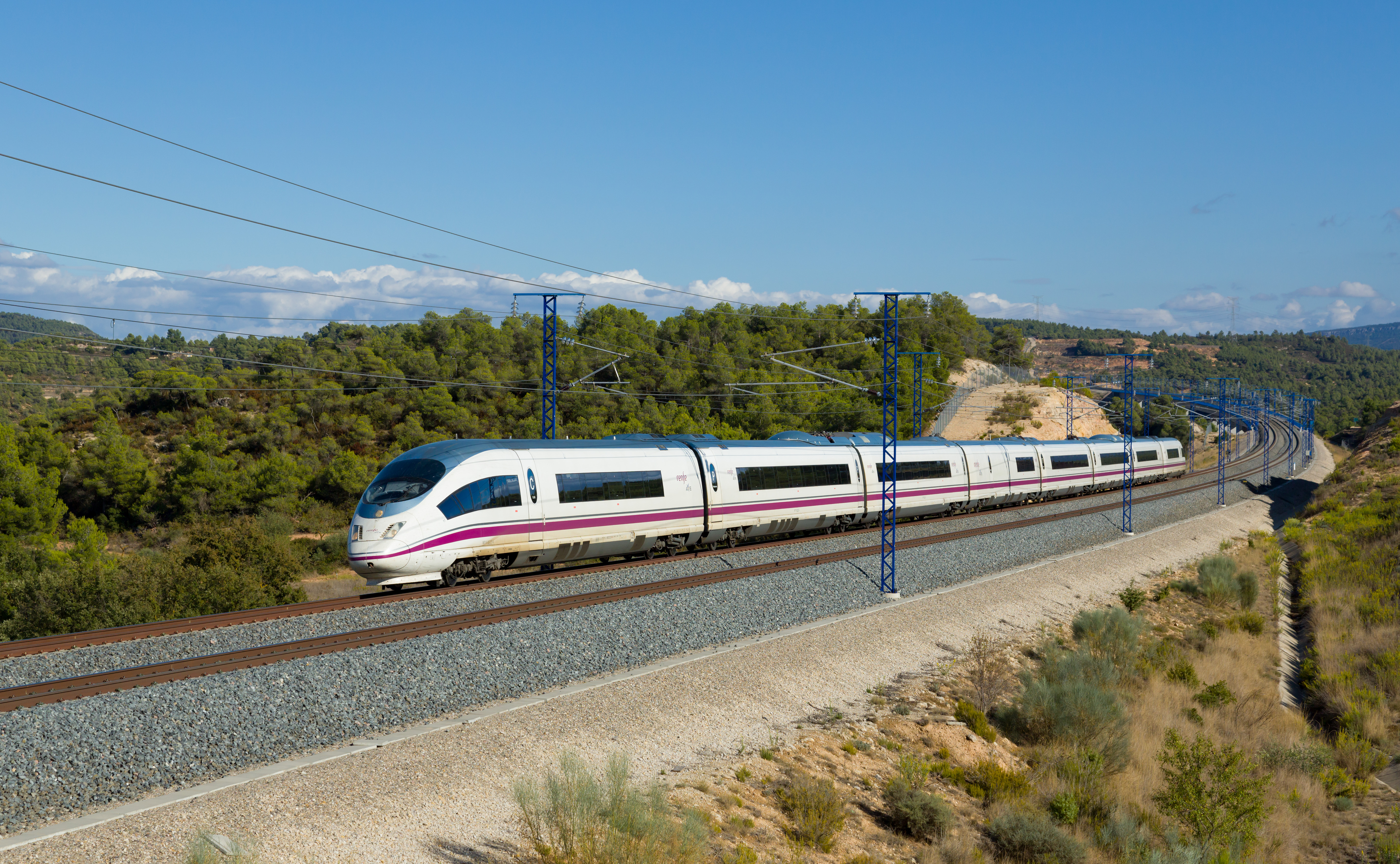
- AVE Class 103 (Siemens Velaro) near Vinaixa

Overview
- Status: Operational
- Owner: Adif
- Locale: Spain (Community of Madrid, Castilla–La Mancha, Aragon, Catalonia)
- Termini: Madrid Puerta de Atocha; Barcelona Sants/Figueres–Vilafant

Service
- Type: High-speed rail
- Operator(s): Renfe Operadora, SNCF (Ouigo), Trenitalia (Iryo)
- Rolling stock: AVE Class 103, 100, and 112
- Ridership: 4.4 million (2019)

History
- Opened: 2008 (first section in 2003)

Technical
- Line length: 620.9 km (385.8 mi) (as far as Barcelona); 748.9 km (465.3 mi) (as far as Figueres)
- Number of tracks: Double track
- Track gauge: 1,435 mm (4 ft 8 1/2 in) standard gauge
- Electrification: 25 kV 50 Hz
- Operating speed: 300 km/h (190 mph); 2011 to 2016: 310 km/h (195 mph)

The Madrid–Barcelona high-speed rail line is a 621-kilometre (385.9 mi) standard-gauge railway line inaugurated on 20 February 2008. Designed for speeds of 350 km/h (217.5 mph) and compatibility with neighbouring countries' rail systems, it connects the cities of Madrid and Barcelona in 2 hours 30 minutes. In Barcelona the line is connected with the Perpignan–Barcelona high-speed rail line leading into France which connects it to the European high speed network.

Trains are operated by the national railway Renfe under the AVE and Avlo brands, and by private competitors Ouigo España and Iryo.

== First stages ==
In 2003 construction of the first phase of a new standard gauge line from Madrid to the French border (Madrid–Zaragoza–Lleida) was completed and on 11 October of that year commercial service began. This service also stopped at Guadalajara–Yebes and Calatayud. The service began running at only 200 km/h (124.3 mph). On 19 May 2006, after two years of operation, speed was increased to 250 km/h (155.3 mph) when the Spanish ASFA signalling system was replaced with level 1 of the new European ETCS/ERTMS system. On 16 October 2006 the trains on this line increased their operating speed to 280 km/h (174.0 mph).

On 18 December 2006 the AVE started operating to Camp de Tarragona, and on 7 May 2007 the service increased its speed to the maximum allowable for the line, 300 km/h (186.4 mph). This puts Tarragona at 30 minutes from Lleida. The extension to Barcelona was delayed various times due to technical problems; the Ministerio de Fomento having originally forecast the AVE's arrival in Barcelona by the end of 2007.

== Complete operation ==
The complete line was opened February 2008. As of 2012, seventeen trains now run every day between the hours of 6 am and 9 pm, covering the distance between the two cities in just 2 hours 30 minutes for the direct trains, and in 3 hours and 10 minutes for those calling at all intermediate stations. Before the high-speed line was built, the journey between the two cities took more than six hours.

Madrid–Barcelona–Figueres line in red

== Speed ==
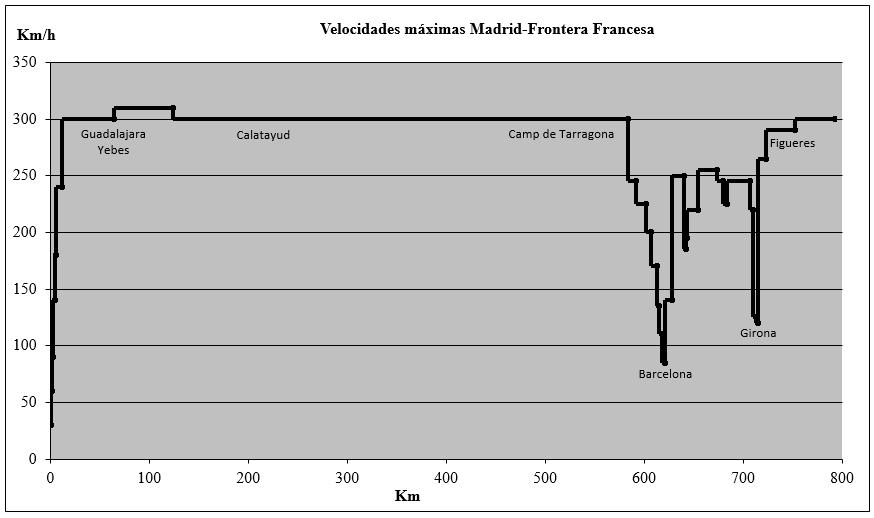
Maximum speed profile of the "Madrid–Barcelona–French Border" line, in 2015

It was originally forecast that, after reaching Barcelona in 2004, the line would run at 350 km/h (217.5 mph), the maximum capable speed of the new Siemens AVE trains S103 which have replaced the Talgo Bombardier AVE S102, after the installation of level 2 of the ETCS/ERTMS. But on the AVE's first day of operating at 300 km/h (186.4 mph) to Tarragona the Minister of Public Works, Magdalena Álvarez, stated that the maximum commercial operating speeds of the AVE on all lines would be 300 km/h (186.4 mph).

On 11 December 2011, the speed was raised to 310 km/h (192.6 mph) on a 60 km (37.3 mi) section of the railway (between km 64.4, near Guadalajara, and km 124.4), with plans to further increase the speed to 320 km/h (198.8 mph) on a 24 km (14.9 mi) sub-section (from km 81.0 to km 105.24) and plans to rapidly extend the 310 km/h (192.6 mph) speed throughout the Spanish high-speed network. Nevertheless, after almost 5 years of operation with S103 trains running at up to 310 km/h (192.6 mph) on this section, the speed was decreased back to 300 km/h (186.4 mph) on 17 August 2016. The tests performed by ADIF had revealed that, at speeds exceeding 300 km/h (186.4 mph), the air which the trains were moving underneath was causing some stones of the ballast to rise, hitting the trains and causing damage of various kinds (the Spanish high-speed railways follow the French high-speed rail model of laying the rails on a bed of stones known as ballast, instead of laying the tracks on concrete plates, as is done for high-speed rail in Germany). Due to this technical limitation and the substantial increase in costs and power necessary to break the 300 km/h (186.4 mph) barrier, the AVE in Spain abandoned prospects of operating at speeds over 300 km/h (186.4 mph) in the short or medium term.

== Usage ==
It was forecast that the AVE would substantially replace air traffic on the Madrid – Barcelona route (in the same way that the Eurostar has on the London–Paris/London–Brussels routes and France's TGV has on the Paris–Lyon route). Indeed, by the end of 2017, the line had already taken 63% of the traffic, taking most of it from aircraft. A few years before the Madrid–Barcelona route was the world's busiest passenger air route in 2007 with 971 scheduled flights per week (both directions). Similarly more than 80% of travelers between Madrid and Seville use the AVE, with fewer than 20% traveling by air.

== Criticism ==
There was criticism during the construction of the Madrid–Barcelona line. A critical report by the consulting firm KPMG, commissioned by ADIF (Administrador de Infraestructuras Ferroviarias) at the behest of the Ministry for Development (Ministerio de Fomento) on 23 June 2004, pointed to a lack of in-depth studies and over-hasty execution of works as the most important reasons for the problems that dogged construction of the AVE line. For example, during the construction of the AVE tunnel near Barcelona, a number of nearby buildings suffered damage from a sinkhole that appeared near a commuter rail station, damaging one of its platforms. The construction committee of Barcelona's famed Sagrada Família church lobbied for a re-routing of the tunnel – it passes within metres of the massive church's foundations. It also passes equally near the UNESCO-recognized Casa Milà also designed by Antoni Gaudí.

Until 2005 both Siemens and Talgo/Bombardier train sets failed to meet scheduled speed targets, although in a test run during the homologation tests of the new S102 trains of Renfe, a train-set Talgo 350 (AVE S-102) reached a speed of 365 km/h (226.8 mph) on the night of the 25/26 June 2006, and in July 2006 a Siemens Velaro train-set (AVE S-103) reached the highest top speed ever in Spain: 403.7 km/h (250.8 mph). At this time, it was a record for railed vehicles in Spain and a world record for unmodified commercial service trainsets, as the earlier TGV and ICE records were achieved with specially modified and shortened trainsets, and the 1996 Shinkansen record of 443 km/h (275.3 mph) was using a test (non-commercial) trainset.

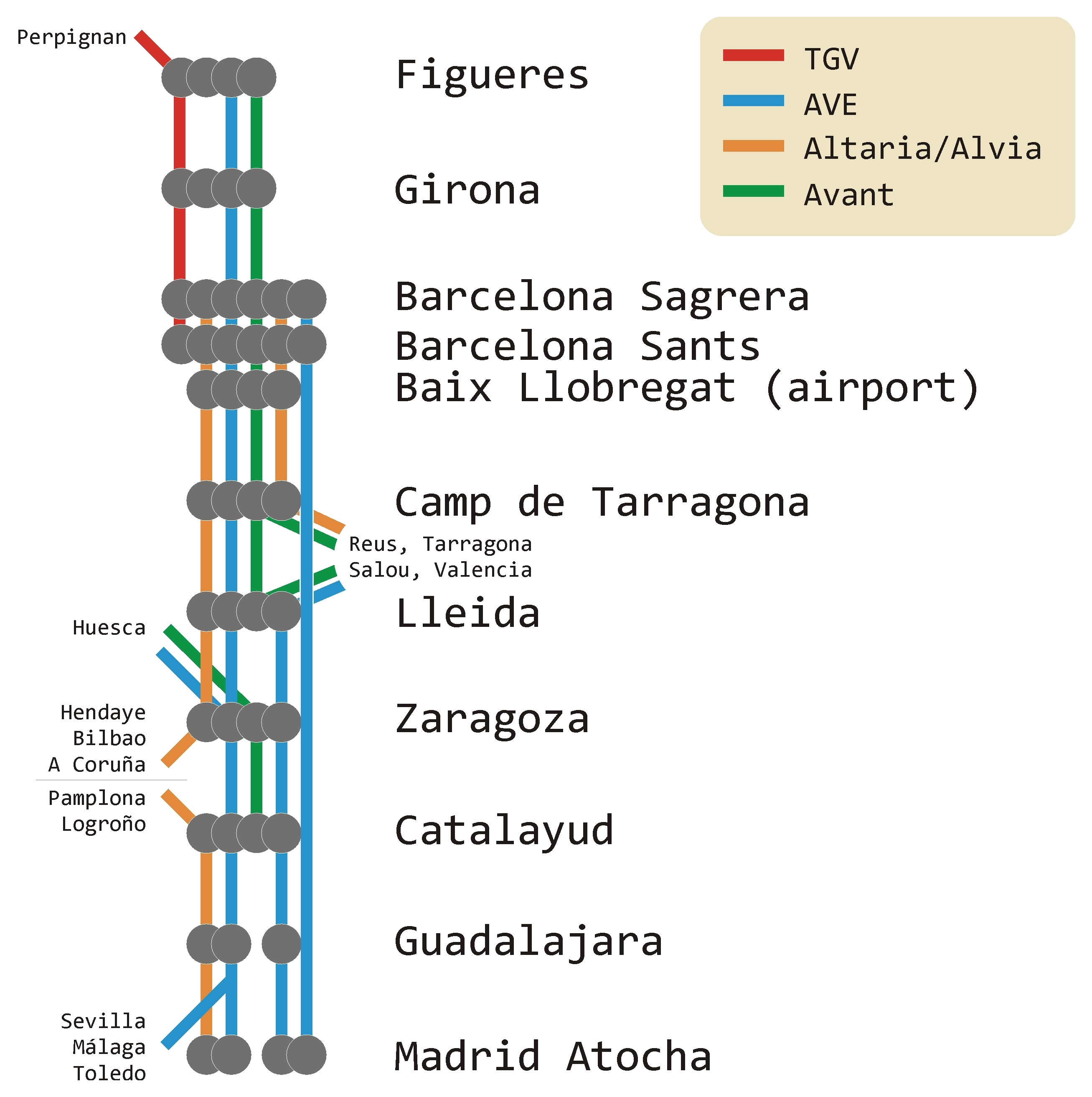
Planned services in 2012

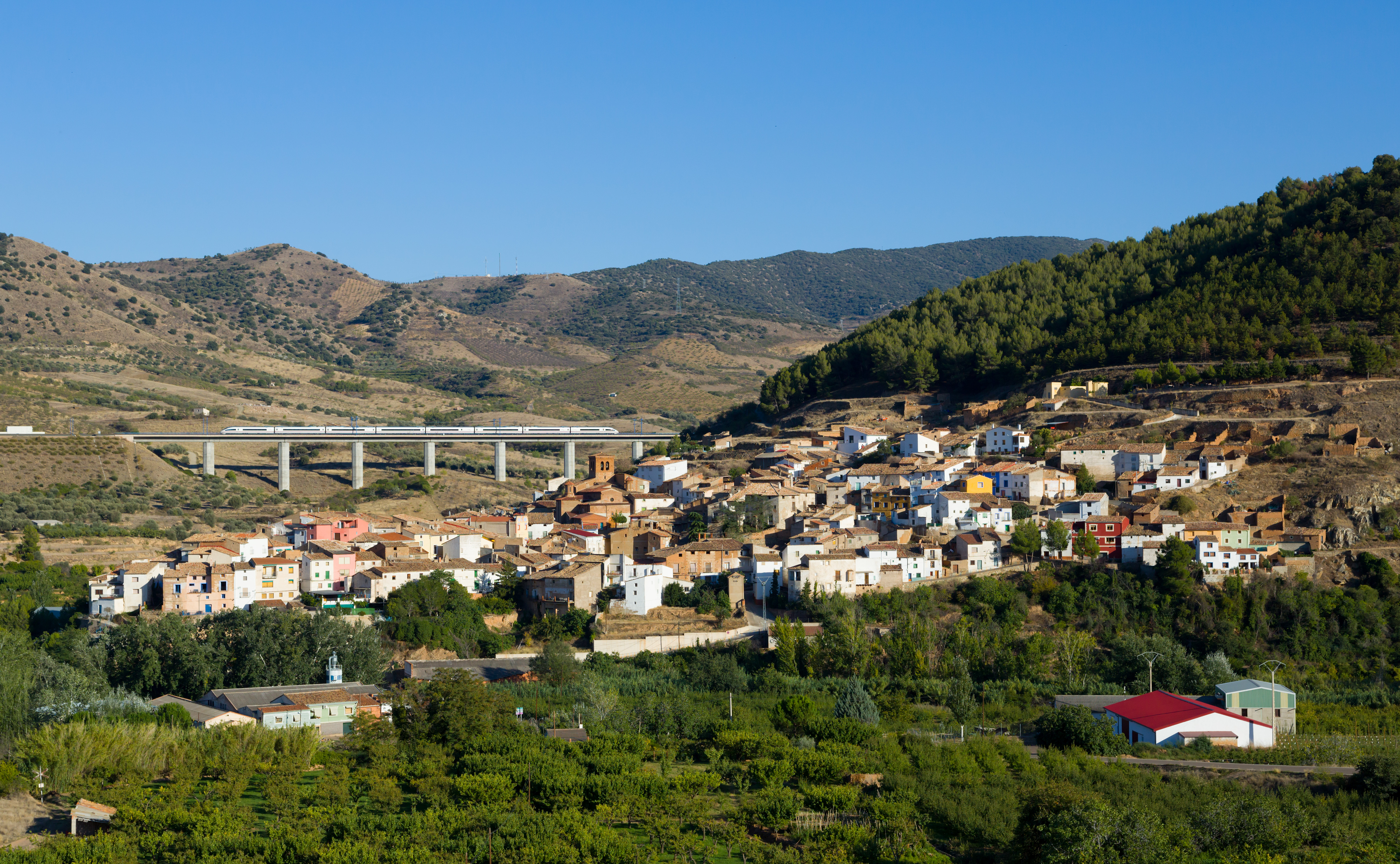
At Paracuellos de la Ribera

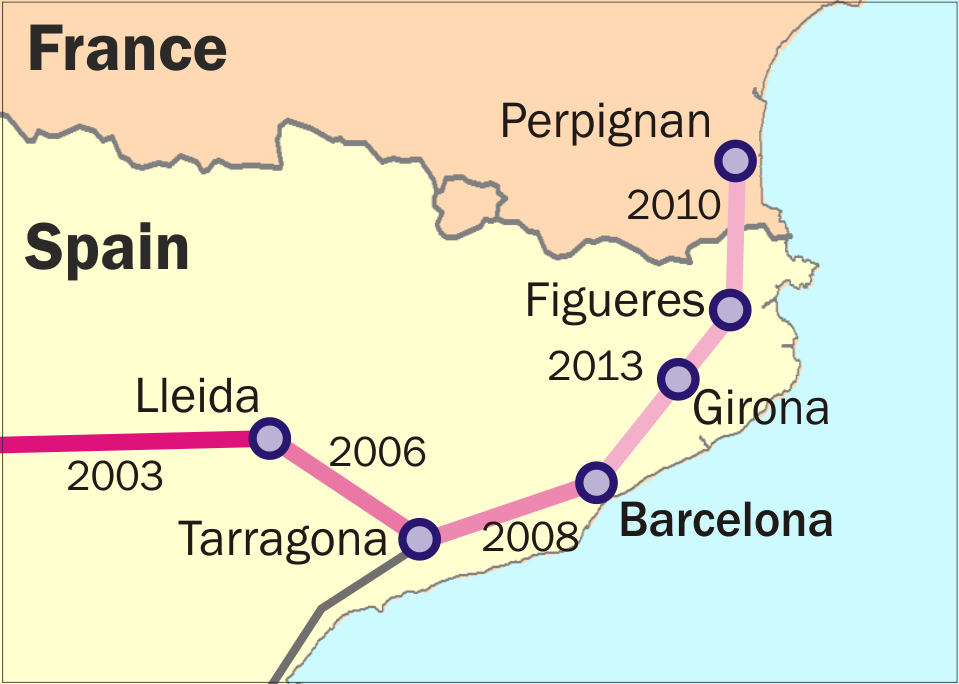
Overview map of the high-speed connections from Barcelona towards France, with the year of opening

== Extension to France ==
=== Barcelona to Figueres ===
Originally planned to open in 2009, the extension of some Madrid–Barcelona routes to Figueres–Vilafant railway station via Girona, opened on 9 January 2013. This made possible upon the completion of the 131-kilometre (81.4 mi) Barcelona–Figueres section of the Perpignan–Barcelona high-speed rail line that connected for the first time the Spanish AVE high-speed network with the French TGV high-speed network. There have been delays in building a four-kilometre tunnel in Girona, the first phase of which was finished in September 2010, and controversy over the route between Sants and Sagrera stations in Barcelona. As of January 2013 there are eight trains a day running from Madrid, connecting at Figueres Vilafant with two TGV services to Paris.

=== Figueres to Perpignan ===
This is an international high-speed rail section between France and Spain. The section connects two cities on opposite sides of the border, Perpignan in Occitanie, France, and Figueres in Catalonia, Spain. It consists of a 44.4-kilometre (27.6 mi) railway which crosses the French–Spanish border via the Perthus Tunnel, an 8.3-kilometre (5.2 mi) tunnel bored under the Perthus Pass. The section is open to high speed trains and freight. Construction was completed in February 2009, although services did not run until a station was built on the line at Figueres. As of March 2015, a daily TGV service connects Paris to Barcelona Sants via Perpignan-Figueres with 2 pairs of trips, plus other connections involving Lyon, Marseille, and Toulouse.

== See also ==
- High-speed rail in Spain
- LGV Méditerranée
- TER Languedoc-Roussillon
- List of highest railways in Europe
