= Renfe Class 103 =

High speed train type

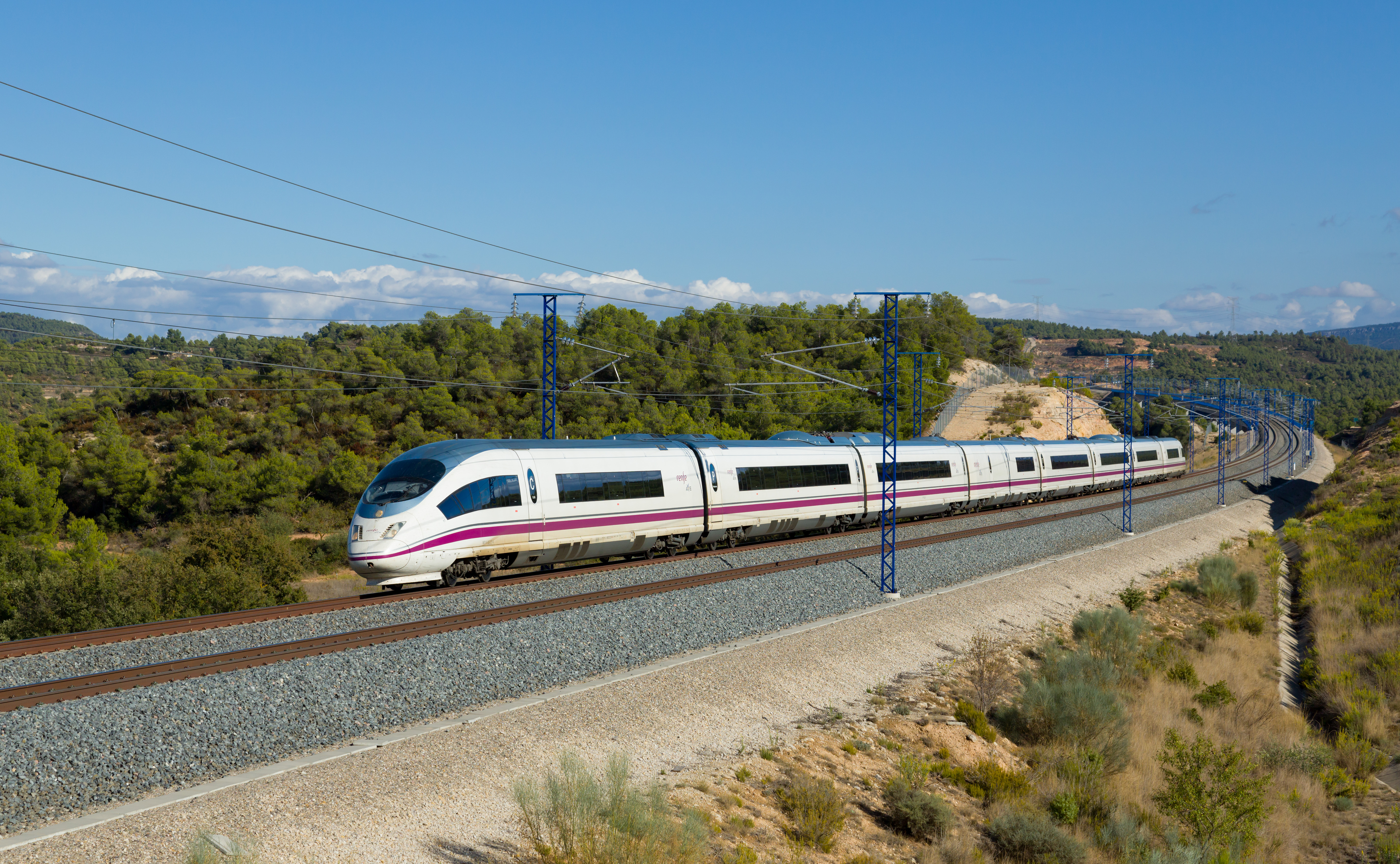
- Series 103 train, Velaro E

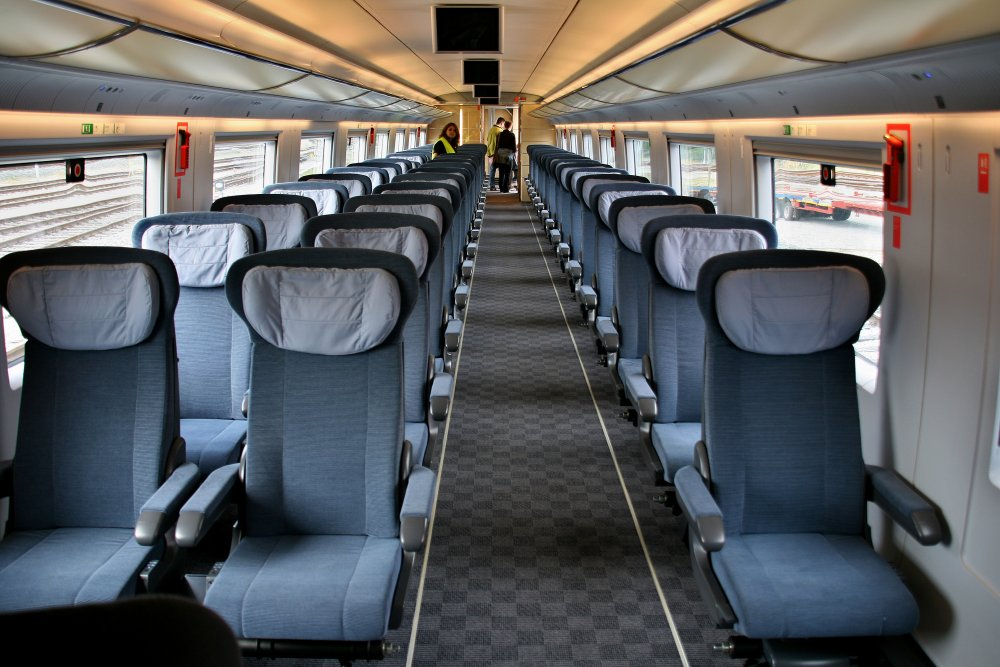
- The interior of a S103 train.
- Stock type: Electric multiple unit
- In service: 2007 - present
- Manufacturer: Siemens
- Family name: Velaro
- Constructed: 2002－2007
- Number built: 26 trainsets
- Formation: 8 cars (driver and passenger integrated cars at either end)
- Capacity: 404
- Operator: Renfe
- Lines served: Madrid - Barcelona; Madrid - Figueres

Specifications
- Car body construction: Aluminium
- Car length: 25.675 m (84 ft 2 7/8 in) (Cab car); 24.775 m (81 ft 3 3/8 in) (Intermediate car)
- Width: 2.95 m (9 ft 8 1/8 in)
- Height: 3.89 m (12 ft 9 1/8 in)
- Wheel diameter: 920 mm
- Maximum speed: 300 km/h (186 mph) (service); 350 km/h (217 mph) (certified); 403.7 km/h (250.8 mph) (test)
- Weight: 425 t (418 long tons; 468 short tons)
- Traction system: Siemens E1150 D2200/770 M5 prfq-1 GTO–C/I
- Traction motors: 16 × Siemens 1TB2019-0GB02 550 kW (740 hp) 3-phase AC induction motor
- Power output: 8,800 kW (11,800 hp)
- Tractive effort: 283 kN (64,000 lb_{f}) Starting; 250 kN (56,000 lb_{f}) Cont. @125 km/h (78 mph)
- Gearbox: Voith SE-380
- Electric system: 25 kV 50 Hz AC overhead line
- Current collection: Pantograph
- UIC classification: Bo′Bo′+2′2′+Bo′Bo′+2′2′ +2′2′+Bo′Bo′+2′2′+Bo′Bo′ (8 car set)
- Braking systems: Regenerative, rheostatic and pneumatic
- Safety systems: LZB, ASFA 200, ERTMS
- Track gauge: 1,435 mm (4 ft 8 1/2 in) standard gauge

The Renfe Class 103 is a high-speed train used for the AVE service and operated in Spain by the state-run railway company Renfe. The trainset is also known as S103 or S/103.

The trains were constructed by Siemens, as the second member of the company's Velaro family.

== History ==
On 24 March 2001, Siemens won one half of Renfe's tender to supply 32 high-speed trains for the Madrid–Barcelona high-speed rail line, offering a modified version of the ICE 3 high-speed train used by German Railways (Deutsche Bahn) for its InterCityExpress service. Changes involved an up-rate to higher power (8,800 kW or 11,800 hp) for higher acceleration and top speed to cover the 651 km (405 mi) between Barcelona and Madrid in 2h30m, the ability to operate in a high range of temperatures, and a different interior.

The ICE 3 trains were a joint production with other Germany-based train manufacturers, who refused to supply parts or sell licenses to Siemens for the AVE Class 103. This caused a delay (for which Siemens eventually paid €21 million), during which Siemens had to re-develop the missing components. However, at the end of this development, Siemens had a complete high-speed train platform, which it named Velaro. The AVE Class 103 was intended as only the second member of a whole family after ICE 3, therefore, it was named by Siemens as the Velaro E.

The AVE Class 103 has been certified to run at 350 km/h (217 mph). During testing between Madrid and Zaragoza, on 16 July 2006, train 005 reached 403.7 km/h (250.8 mph). This is the current national rail speed record for Spain, and remained the international record for a normal series train in standard configuration until 2010.

On 23 December 2005, RENFE ordered a further 10 identical trains (Siemens designation Velaro E2). Currently, all 26 trains from both orders have been delivered and are in service.

== Specifications ==
The certified top speed of the AVE Class 103 is 350 km/h (217 mph), currently the highest for any train in the world, although the Alstom AGV, currently conducting extensive tests, aims for certification at 360 km/h (224 mph).

The class has distributed traction, traction equipment was moved underfloor, with powered bogies distributed in alternate carriages along the length of the train. This removes the need for driving units at either end, which AVE Class 100 and 102 have, allowing a better use of space, better energy efficiency, better acceleration at lower speeds, and better ability to climb grades. For the AVE Class 103, four of the eight cars were fitted with two powered bogies each.

Electronically, the train is actually two identical half-trains of four coaches each, each with an independent power system, apart from the active pantograph (only a single pantograph is raised on AC-fed rail lines) and a high voltage line along the entire length of the 8-car train.

The train's capacity of 404 passengers is split between three classes; with two coupled 8-car trains total capacity is therefore 808 passengers. In the end coaches (driving trailers), glass screens separate the driver and passengers, and allow passengers the same views as the driver, just as in the ICE 3 and other Velaros. The driver can turn these opaque if necessary or preferred.

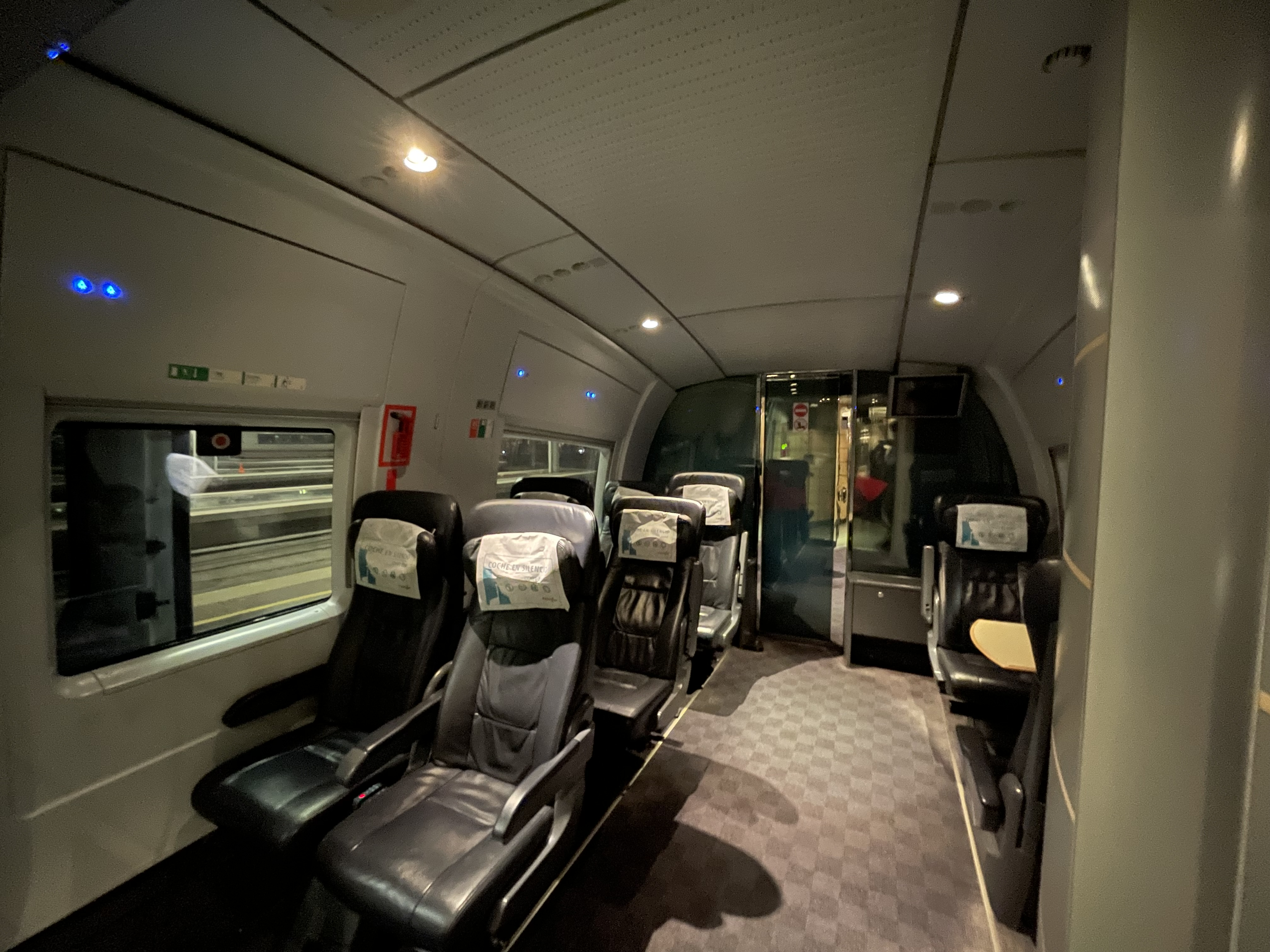
Preferente Class

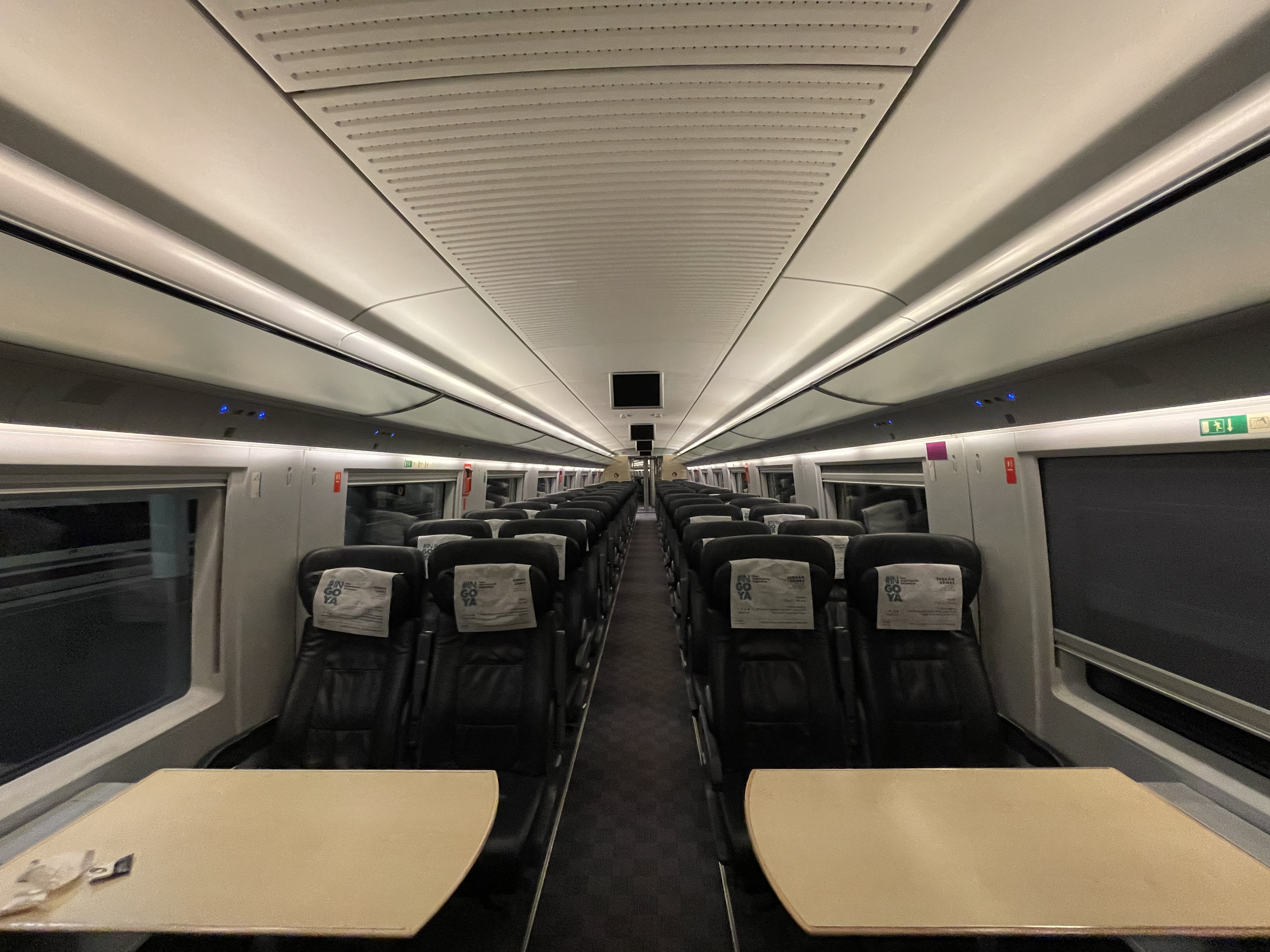
Turista Class train interior

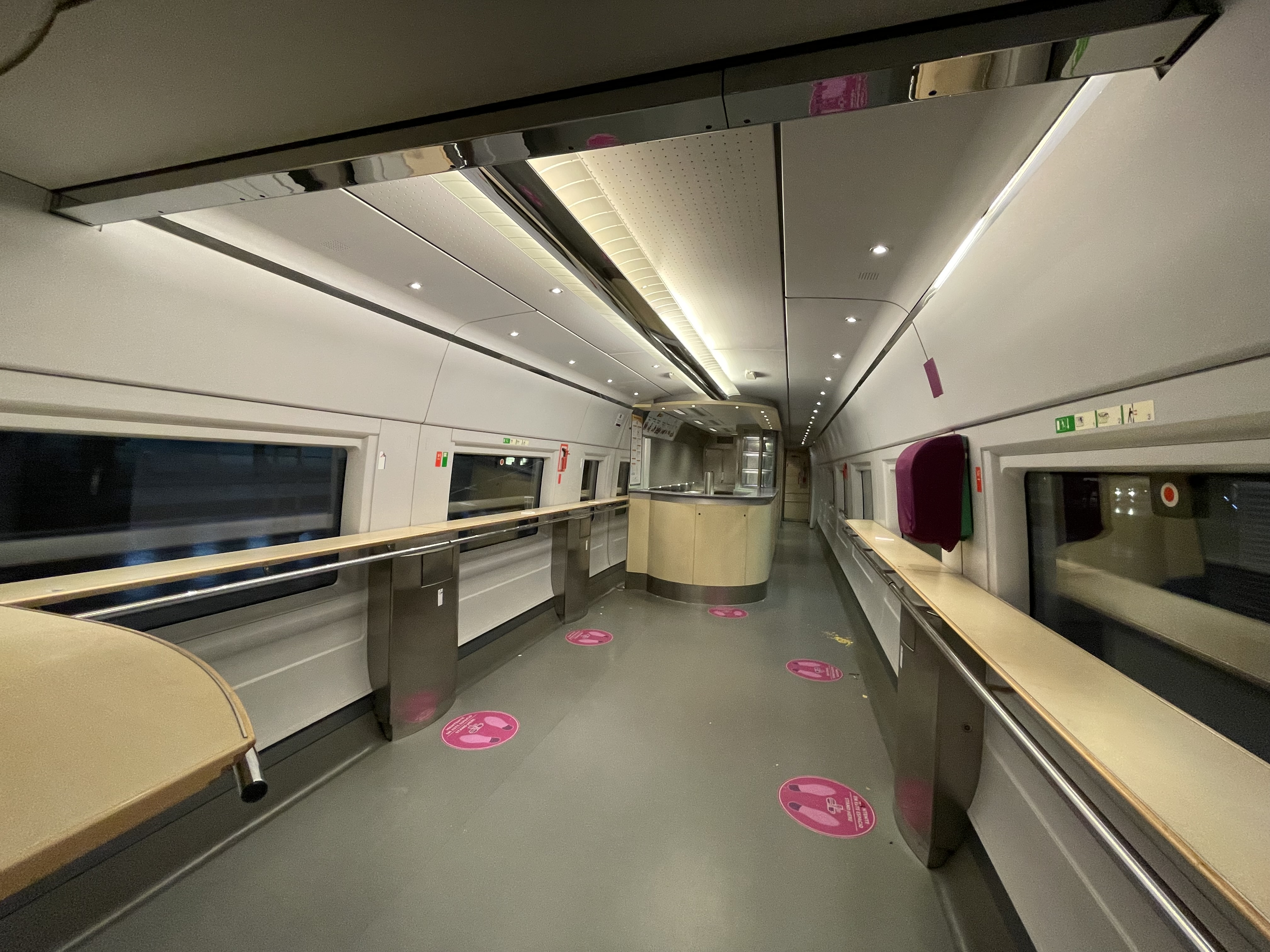
Interior of the Cafeteria Car

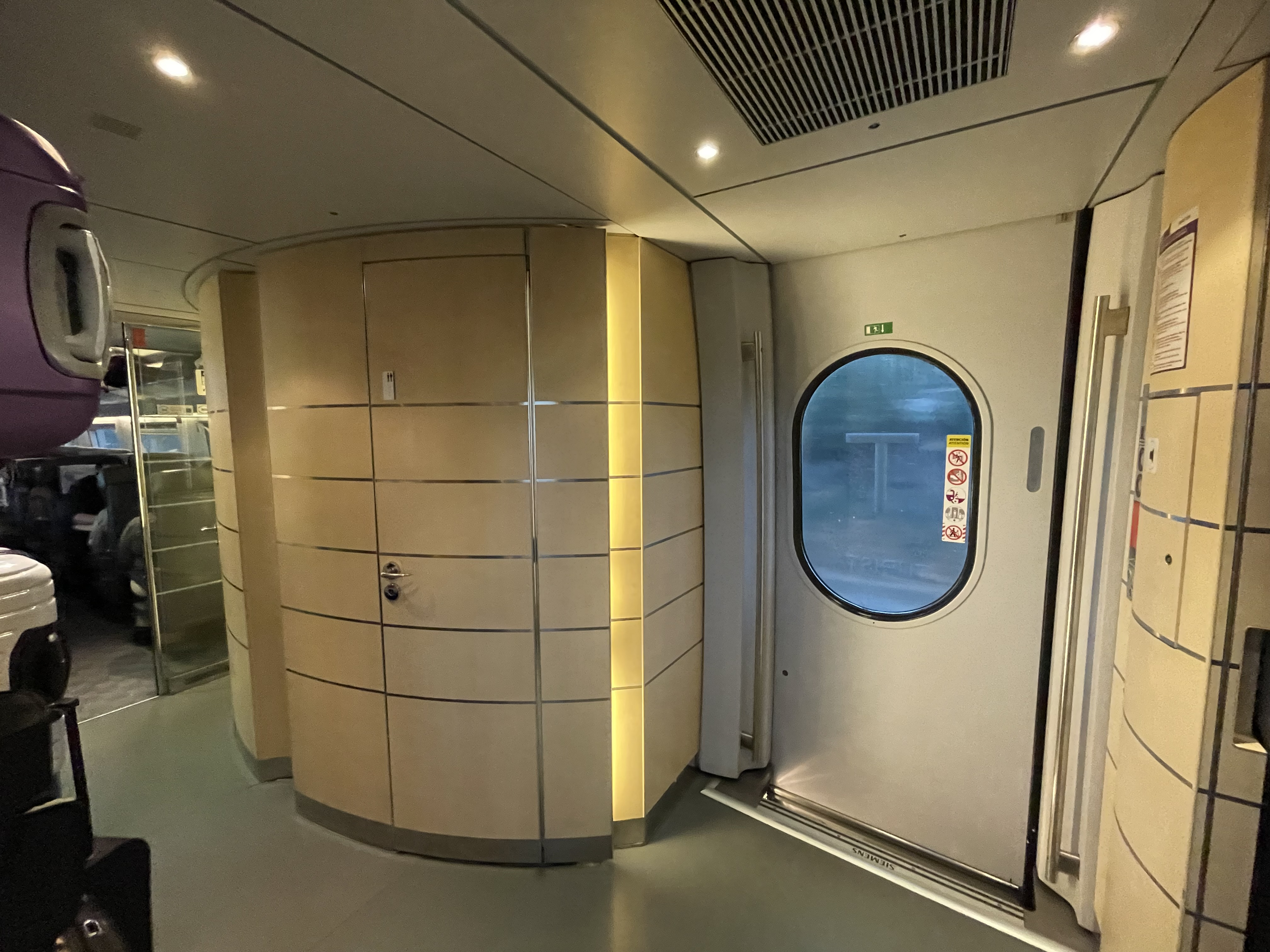
Area next to the train door and restroom

== In service ==
The AVE Class 103 entered commercial service on 22 June 2007, between Madrid and the temporary end of the line to Barcelona near Tarragona.

While the trains and the tracks were commissioned for a regular top speed of 350 km/h (217 mph), the train control and signalling system necessary for such operation, ETCS Level 2, was not ready for service. Therefore, commercial top speed was initially limited with ETCS Level 1 to 300 km/h (186 mph).

Between 11 December 2011 until 17 August 2016, trains reached a maximum speed of 310 km/h (193 mph) between Guadalajara and Calatayud. Trains have since been running with a maximum speed of 300 km/h (186 mph) in service.

ERTMS is technically capable of supporting speeds of up to 500 km/h (311 mph), but the signal spacing on the Madrid-Barcelona line was initially, from 7 May 2007, only sufficient to support speeds of 300 km/h (186 mph).

From the opening of the Córdoba–Málaga high-speed rail line on 24 December 2007, the AVE Class 103 were also used from Madrid to Málaga.

On 20 February 2008, the final section of the Madrid–Barcelona high-speed rail line into Barcelona was opened. From that day, the AVE Class 103 were used for the faster services between Madrid and Barcelona, achieving the shortest travel time of 2h30m on the non-stop runs.

== Accidents and incidents ==
On 28 October 2026, unit 103-006 of this train type was involved in the 2026 Toledo train collision.

== See also ==
- List of high-speed trains
- Siemens Velaro
- Stamps with AVE Class 103
- AVE Class 102
