= High-speed rail in France =

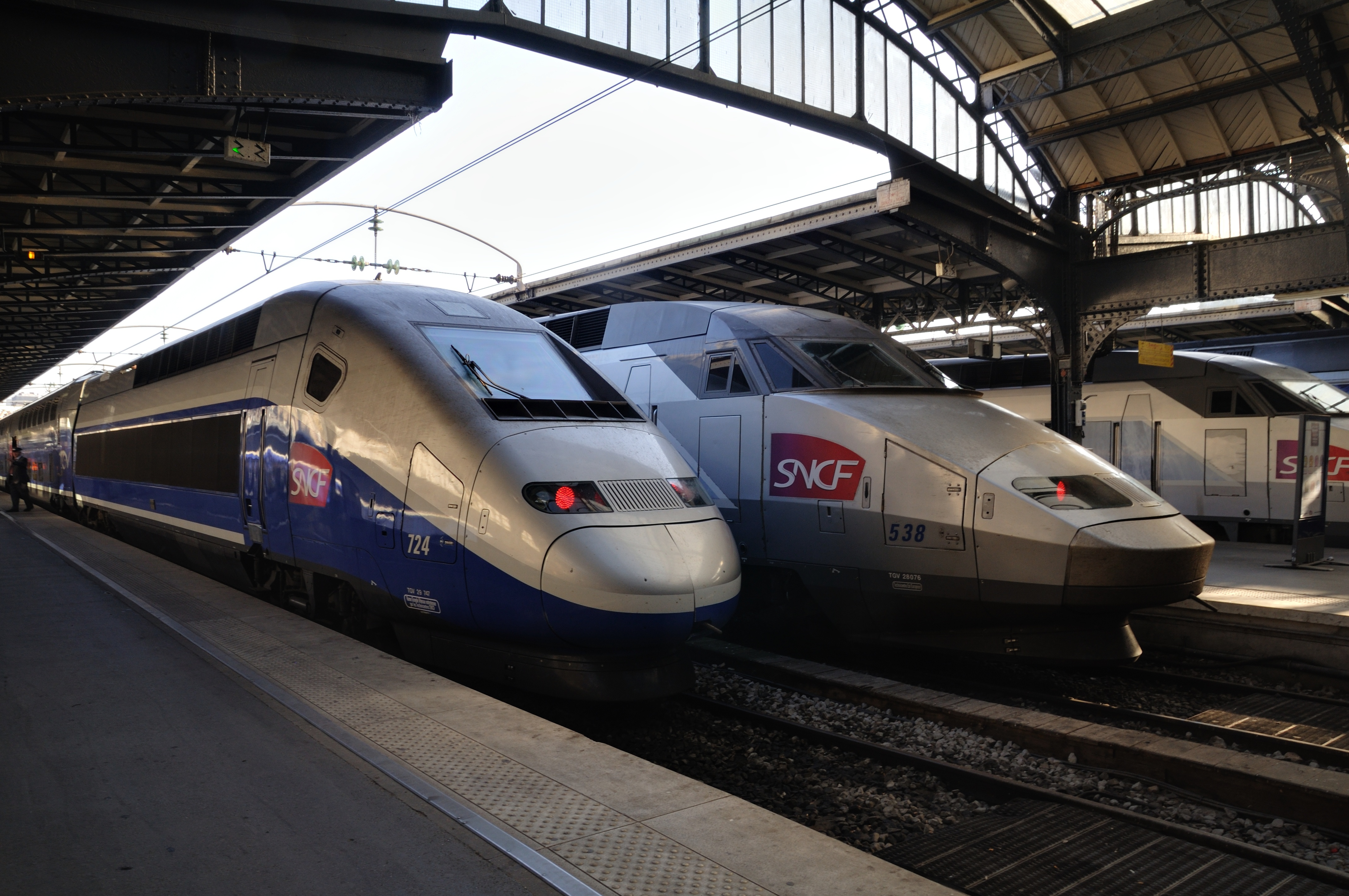
Three TGVs at Paris's Gare de l'Est (2010)

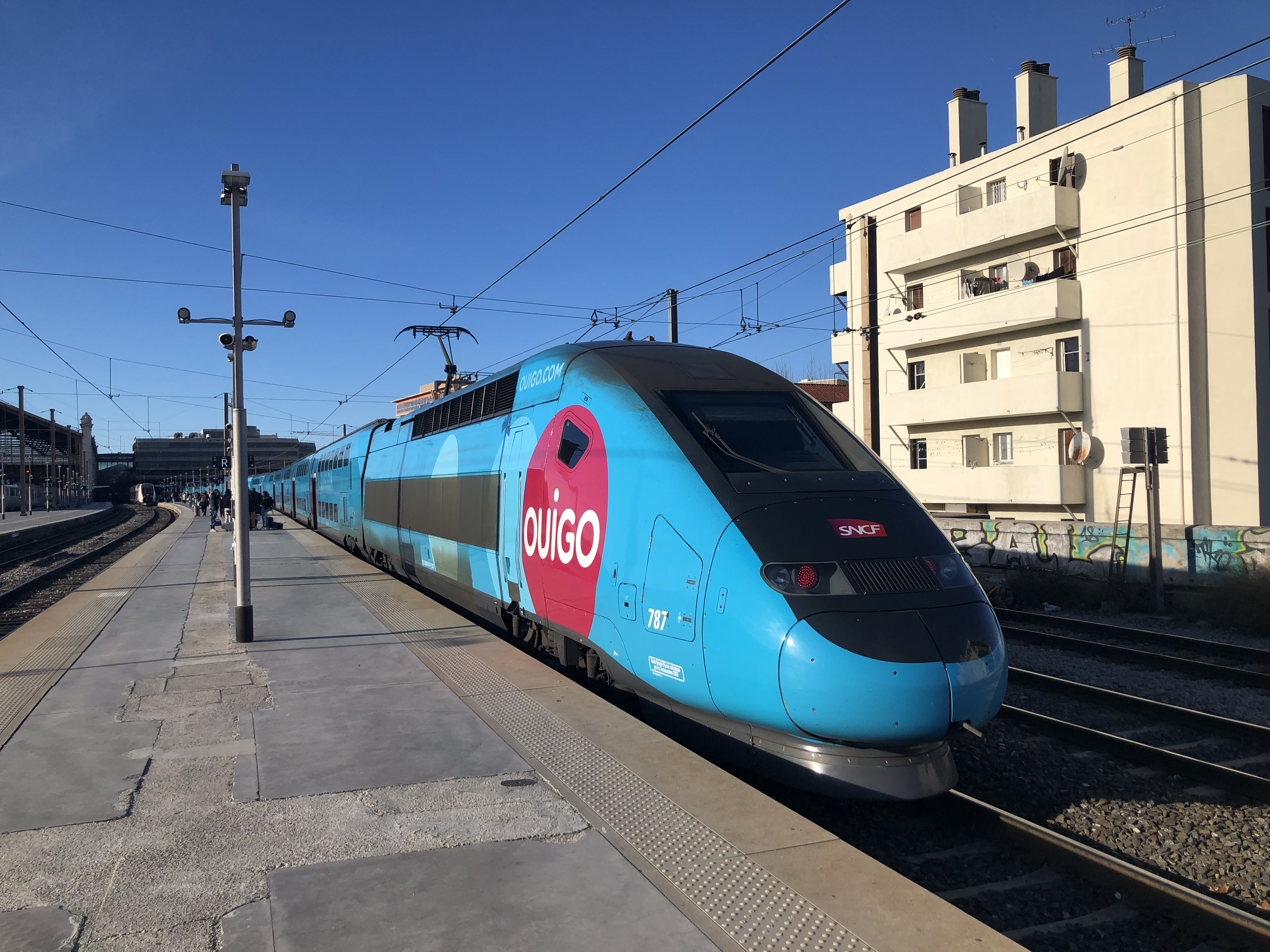
A Ouigo train in Marseille (2022)

France has a large network of high-speed rail lines. As of June 2021, the French high-speed rail network comprises 2,800 km (1,740 mi) of tracks, making it one of the largest in Europe and the world. As of early 2023, new lines are being constructed or planned. The first French high-speed railway, the LGV Sud-Est, linking the suburbs of Paris and Lyon, opened in 1981.

In addition to serving destinations across France, the high-speed rail network is also connected to the United Kingdom, Spain, Belgium, the Netherlands, Luxembourg, Germany, Switzerland and Italy. SNCF, France's state-owned rail company and the network’s main operator, runs both a premium service (TGV inOui) and a budget service (Ouigo). The French national high-speed rail network follows the spoke-and-hub model, centred on Paris. Besides SNCF, it is also used by Eurostar, Thalys, Deutsche Bahn, Trenitalia France, RENFE, and the Swiss Federal Railways.

== Tracks ==
The newest high-speed lines allow speeds of 320 km/h (200 mph) in normal operation: originally LGVs were defined as lines permitting speeds greater than 200 km/h (125 mph), revised to 250 km/h (155 mph). Like most high-speed trains in Europe, TGVs also run on conventional tracks (French: lignes classiques), at the normal maximum speed for those lines, up to 220 km/h (137 mph). This allows them to reach secondary destinations or city centres without building new tracks all the way, reducing costs compared to the magnetic levitation train project in Japan, for example, or complete high-speed networks with a different gauge from the surrounding conventional networks, in Spain and Japan, for example.

=== Track design ===
High-speed railway track construction in France has a few key differences from normal railway lines. The radii of curves are larger so that trains can traverse them at higher speeds without increasing the centripetal acceleration felt by passengers. The radii of LGV curves have historically been greater than 4 km (2.5 mi): new lines have minimum radii of 7 km (4.3 mi) to allow for future increases in speed.

LGVs can incorporate steeper gradients than normal. This facilitates planning and reduces their cost of construction. The high power/weight and adhesive weight/total weight ratios of TGVs allow them to climb much steeper grades than conventional trains. The considerable momentum at high speeds also helps to climb these slopes very quickly without greatly increasing energy consumption. The Paris-Sud-Est LGV has gradients of up to 3.5% (on the German NBS high-speed line between Cologne and Frankfurt they reach 4%). On a high-speed line it is possible to have greater superelevation (cant), since all trains are travelling at the same (high) speed and a train stopping on a curve is a very rare event. Curve radii in high-speed lines have to be large, but increasing the superelevation allows for tighter curves while supporting the same train speed. Allowance for tighter curves can reduce construction costs by reducing the number and/or length of tunnels or viaducts and the volume of earthworks.

Track alignment is more precise than on normal railway lines, and ballast is in a deeper-than-normal profile, resulting in increased load-bearing capacity and track stability. LGV track is anchored by more sleepers/ties per kilometre than normal, and all are made of concrete, either mono- or bi-bloc, the latter consisting of two separate blocks of concrete joined by a steel bar. Heavy rail (UIC 60) is used and the rails are more upright, with an inclination of 1 in 40 as opposed to 1 in 20 on normal lines. Use of continuously welded rails in place of shorter, jointed rails yields a comfortable ride at high speed, without the "clickety-clack" vibrations induced by rail joints.

The points/switches are different from those on the lignes Classique's. Every LGV set of points incorporates a swingnose crossing (coeur à pointe mobile or 'moveable point frog'), which eliminates the gap in rail support that causes shock and vibration as wheels of a train pass over the 'frog' of conventional points. Eliminating these gaps makes the passage of a TGV over LGV switches imperceptible to passengers, reduces stresses on wheels and track, and permits much higher speeds, 160 km/h (100 mph). At junctions, such as the junction on the TGV Atlantique where the line to Le Mans diverges from the line to Tours, special points designed for higher speeds are installed which permit a diverging speed of 574 km/h (357 mph).

The diameter of tunnels is greater than normally required by the size of the trains, especially at entrances. This limits the effects of air pressure changes and noise pollution such as tunnel boom, which can be problematic at TGV speeds.

=== Traffic limitations ===
LGVs are reserved primarily for TGVs. One reason for this is that line capacity is sharply reduced when trains of differing speeds are mixed, as the interval between two trains then needs to be large enough that the faster one cannot over-take the slower one between two passing loops. Passing freight and passenger trains also constitute a safety risk, as cargo on freight cars could be destabilised by the air turbulence caused by the TGV.

The permitted axle load on LGV lines is 17 t, imposed to prevent heavy rolling stock from prematurely damaging the very accurate track alignment ('surface') required for high-speed operation. Conventional trains hauled by locomotives are generally not allowed, since the axle load of a typical European electric locomotive exceeds 20 t. The only freight trains that are generally permitted are mail trains run by the French postal service, using specially adapted TGV rolling stock and running at TGV speed. TGV power cars, the lightweight streamlined locomotives at both ends of TGV trainsets, are within the 17 t limit, but special design efforts were needed (a 'hunt for kilograms', chasse aux kilos) to keep the mass of the double-deck TGV Duplex trains within the 17 t limit when they were introduced in the 1990s.

The steep gradients common on LGVs would limit the weight of slow freight trains. Slower trains would also mean that the maximum track cant (banking on curves) would be limited, so for the same maximum speed a mixed-traffic LGV would need to be built with curves of even larger radius. Such track would be much more expensive to build and maintain.

Some stretches of less-used LGV are routinely mixed-traffic, such as the Tours branch of the LGV Atlantique and the Nîmes/Montpellier branch of the LGV Mediterranée. The British High Speed 1 from the Channel Tunnel to London has been built with passing loops to support freight use, but this facility is used infrequently.

Maintenance on LGVs is carried out at night, when no TGVs are running.

Outside France, LGV-type lines often carry non-TGV intercity traffic, often as a requirement of the initial funding commitments. The Belgian LGV from Brussels to Liège carries 200 km/h (125 mph) loco-hauled trains, with both the Dutch HSL-Zuid and British High Speed 1 planned to carry 200 and 225 km/h (124 and 140 mph) domestic intercity services respectively and 300 km/h (186 mph) international services. The Channel Tunnel is not an LGV, but it uses LGV-type TVM signalling for mixed freight, shuttle and Eurostar traffic at between 100 and 160 km/h (60 and 100 mph). The standard pathway for allocation purposes is the time taken by a Eurotunnel shuttle train (maximum speed 140 km/h (87 mph)) to traverse the tunnel. A single Eurostar running at 160 km/h (100 mph) occupies 2.67 standard paths; a second Eurostar running 3 minutes behind the first "costs" only a single additional path, so Eurostar services are often flighted 3 minutes apart between London and Lille. A freight train running at 120 km/h (75 mph) occupies 1.33 paths, at 100 km/h (62 mph) 3 paths. This illustrates the problem of mixed traffic at different speeds.

Train class	Speed	Paths	
Eurostar	160 km/h	2 2/3	"catches up" with earlier trains
Eurostar (second of pair)	160 km/h	1	consecutive "flighted pair" at same speed
Eurotunnel Shuttle	140 km/h	1	optimal usage, all trains at same speed
Multi-modal freight	120 km/h	1 1/3	"holds up" train behind it

=== Power supply ===
LGVs are all electrified at 25 kV 50 Hz AC. Catenary wires are kept at a greater mechanical tension than normal lines because the pantograph causes oscillations in the wire, and the wave must travel faster than the train to avoid producing standing waves that would cause the wires to break. This was a problem when rail speed record attempts were made in 1990; tension had to be increased further still to accommodate train speeds of over 500 km/h (311 mph). On LGVs only the rear pantograph is raised, avoiding amplification of the oscillations created by a front pantograph. The front power car is supplied by a cable along the roof of the train. Eurostar trains are long enough that oscillations are damped sufficiently between the front and rear power cars (British designers were wary of running a high-power line through passenger carriages, thus the centrally located power cars in the ill-fated Advanced Passenger Train), so the two power cars could be connected without a high voltage cable through passenger vehicles. The same applies when two TGVs run in multiple. On lignes classiques, slower maximum speeds prevent oscillation problems, and on DC lines both pantographs must be raised to draw sufficient current.

=== Separation ===
LGVs are fenced to prevent trespassing by animals and people. Level crossings are not permitted and overbridges have sensors to detect objects that fall onto the track.

All LGV junctions are grade-separated, the tracks crossing each other using flyovers or tunnels, eliminating crossings on the level.

== Signalling ==
Signalling block marker

Because TGVs on LGVs travel too fast for their drivers to see and react to traditional lineside signals, an automated system called TVM, "Transmission Voie-Machine" (track-to-train transmission) is used for signalling. Information is transmitted to trains by electrical pulses sent through the rails, providing speed, target speed, and stop/go indications directly to the driver via dashboard-mounted instruments. This high degree of automation does not eliminate driver control, though there are safeguards that can safely stop the train in the event of driver error.

An LGV is divided into signal blocks of about 1500 m (≈1 mile) with the boundaries marked by blue boards with a yellow triangle. Dashboard instruments show the maximum permitted speed for the current block and a target speed based on the profile of the line ahead. The speeds are based on factors such as the proximity of trains ahead (with steadily decreasing speeds permitted in blocks closer to the rear of the next train), junction placement, speed restrictions, the top speed of the train and distance from the end of the LGV. As trains cannot usually stop within one signal block, which can range in length from a few hundred metres to a few kilometres, drivers are alerted to slow gradually several blocks before a required stop.

Two versions, TVM-430 and TVM-300, are in use. TVM-430 was first installed on the LGV Nord to the Channel Tunnel and Belgium, and supplies trains with more information than TVM-300. Among other benefits, TVM-430 allows a train's onboard computer to generate a continuous speed control curve in the event of an emergency brake activation, effectively forcing the driver to reduce speed safely without releasing the brake by displaying the Flashing Signal Aspects on the speedometer. When the flashing signal is displayed, the driver must apply the brake and target speed will be more constrained at the next block section.

The signalling system is normally permissive: the driver of a train is permitted to proceed into an occupied block section without first obtaining authorisation. Speed is limited to 30 km/h (19 mph), and if it exceeds 35 km/h (22 mph) the emergency brake is applied. If the board marking the entrance to the block section is accompanied by a sign marked Nf, non-franchissable (non-passable) the block section is not permissive, and the driver must obtain authorisation from the PAR, "Poste d'Aiguillage et de Régulation" (Signalling and Control Centre), before entering. Once a route is set or the PAR has provided authorisation, a white lamp above the board is lit to inform the driver. The driver acknowledges the authorisation by a button on the control panel. This disables the emergency braking, which would otherwise occur when passing over the ground loop adjacent to the Nf board.

When trains enter or leave LGVs they pass over a ground loop that automatically switches the driver's dashboard indicators to the appropriate signalling system. For example, a train leaving an LGV for a "ligne classique" has its TVM system deactivated and its traditional KVB "Contrôle de Vitesse par Balises" (beacon speed control) system enabled.

The most recent LGV, LGV Est, is equipped with European Train Control System Level 2 signalling together with TVM-430. It is equipped with GSM-R radio communications, one component of the European Rail Traffic Management System: the communications-based ETCS Level 2 signalling system is the other component, which makes use of the radio network. Trains can operate using either signalling system. Domestic TGVs use TVM-430, while TGV POS trainsets that operate into Germany use ETCS Level 2. ETCS Level 2 and TVM-430 use the same block sections, but use different means (radio links for ETCS, and track-to-train transmission for TVM-430) to transmit signal information to trains. Since ERTMS is mandated for eventual adoption throughout the European Union, similar installations including ETCS signalling are expected on future LGVs.

== Stations ==
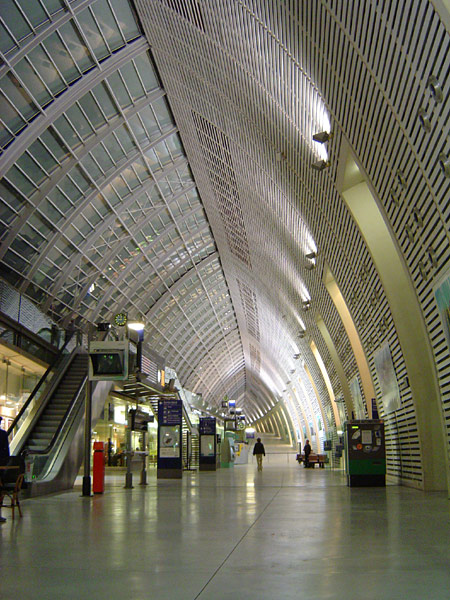
Avignon TGV station

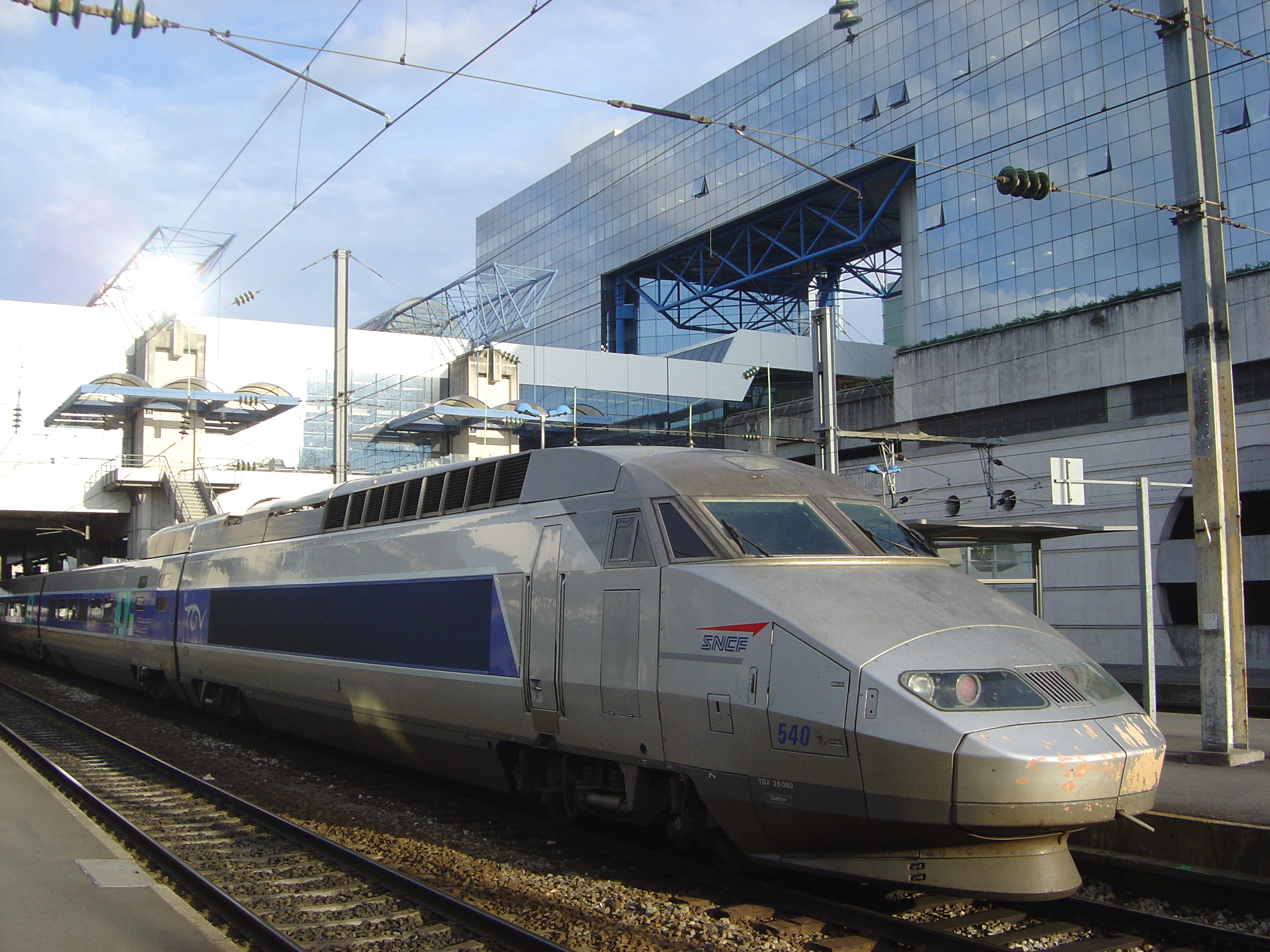
TGV Réseau trainset 540 at Rennes, in Brittany

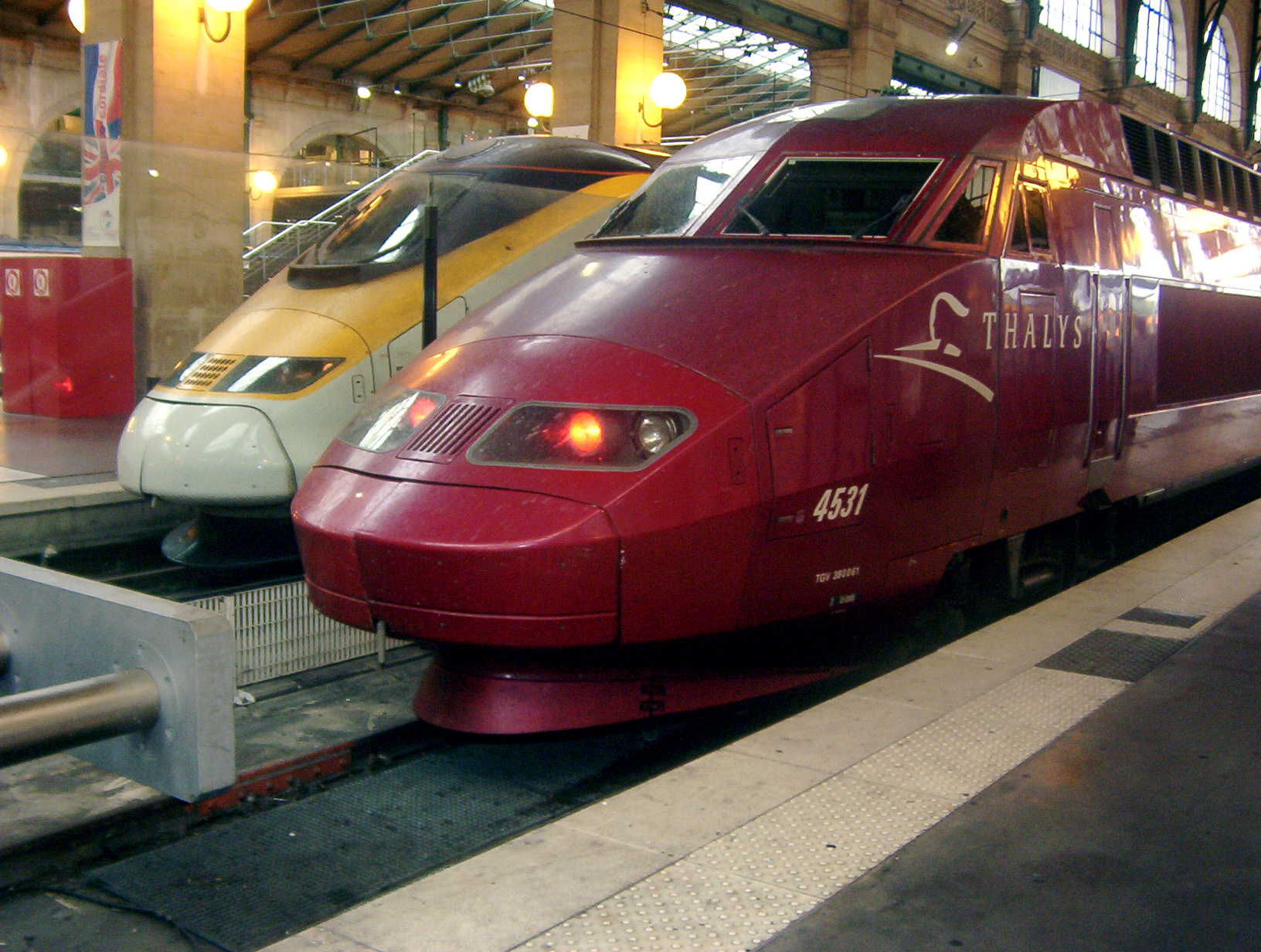
Eurostar and Thalys PBA side by side in Paris Gare du Nord

One of the main advantages of TGV over technologies such as magnetic levitation is that TGVs can use existing infrastructure at its lower design speed. This makes connecting city centre stations such as Paris-Gare de Lyon and Lyon-Perrache by TGV a simple and inexpensive proposition, using existing intra-city tracks and stations built for conventional trains.

LGV route designers have tended to build new intermediate stations in suburban areas or in the open countryside several kilometers away from cities. This allows TGVs to stop without incurring too great a time penalty, since more time is spent on high-speed track; in addition, many cities' stations are stub-ends, while LGVs frequently bypass cities. In some cases, stations have been built halfway between two communities, such as the station serving Montceau-les-Mines and Le Creusot, and Haute Picardie station between Amiens and Saint-Quentin. The press and local authorities criticised Haute Picardie as being too far from either town to be convenient, and too far from connecting railway lines to be useful for travellers. The station was nicknamed la gare des betteraves ('beet station') as it was surrounded by sugar beet fields during construction. That said, the station is now used by a reasonable number of people, especially impressive as it has no service to Paris (so not to extract passengers from Amiens station). This nickname is now applied to similar stations away from town and city centres, whether in the vicinity of beet fields or not.

New railway stations have been built for TGVs, some of which are considerable architectural achievements. Avignon TGV station, opened in 2001, has been praised as "one of the most remarkable stations on the network", with a 340 m (1,115 ft 6 in)-long glazed roof that has been compared to that of a cathedral.

== Operators ==
=== SNCF Voyageurs ===
SNCF Voyageurs is the main high-speed train operator in France, with its main brand TGV inOui, as well as its low-cost brand Ouigo Grande Vitesse. It uses a variety of TGV type trains, from the original TGV Sud-Est, introduced in 1981, to the TGV 2N2 "Euroduplex", in 2011.

=== Lyria ===
Lyria, a joint-company between SNCF and the Swiss Federal Railways, operates on the LGV Sud-Est since 1993, the LGV Rhin-Rhône since 2011, the LGV Nord, the LGV Rhône-Alpes and the LGV Méditerranée since 2012. It did operate on the LGV Est between 2007 and 2011. TGV 2N2 are used by Lyria on these lines.

=== Eurostar ===
Eurostar operates on the LGV Nord since 1994, with services from Paris-Nord to Dortmund, and between Paris-Nord, London, and Amsterdam. It uses Eurostar e300 and e320 as well as TGV PBA and PBKA trainsets.

=== Deutsche Bahn ===
As part of their service cooperation with SNCF Voyageurs between France and Germany (formerly named Alleo), Deutsche Bahn operates on the LGV Est since 2007. It uses ICE Velaro D trainsets.

=== Renfe ===
Renfe operates on the LGV Rhône-Alpes, the LGV Méditerranée and the LGV Perpignan–Figueres since 2023, using AVE Class 100 trainsets.

=== Trenitalia France ===
Trenitalia France, a subsidiary of Trenitalia, operates on the LGV Sud-Est since 2021 with services from Paris Gare de Lyon to Milano Centrale with stops in Lyon-Part-Dieu, Chambéry, Modane and Torino Porta Susa. On 15 June 2025, it launched services between Paris Gare de Lyon and Marseille-Saint-Charles, operating further south on the LGV Rhône-Alpes and the LGV Méditerranée, with stops in Lyon-Saint-Exupéry TGV, Avignon TGV, and Aix-en-Provence TGV. It uses Frecciarossa 1000 trainsets.

=== Future operators ===
==== Kevin Speed ====
Their service named Ilisto is expected to be introduced in the second half of 2030, with routes between Paris and Lille, Strasbourg, and Lyon, using 20 Avelia Stream trainsets.

==== Le Train ====
This operator's main focus is on the route between Bordeaux and Rennes, expected to begin in 2028, as well as between Paris, Bordeaux, and Rennes, with Talgo AVRIL trainsets.

==== Velvet ====
Proxima expects to begin its service between Paris and Bordeaux under the Velvet brand in 2028, with 12 Avelia Horizon trainsets.

==== Virgin Trains Europe ====
Having secured access in 2025 to Temple Mills Depot near London, the British company Virgin Trains Europe aims to begin service between London and Paris in October 2030, London and Brussels in February 2031, and London and Amsterdam in September 2031. As of May 2026, their expected 12 Avelia Stream trainsets remain to be ordered.

== Network ==
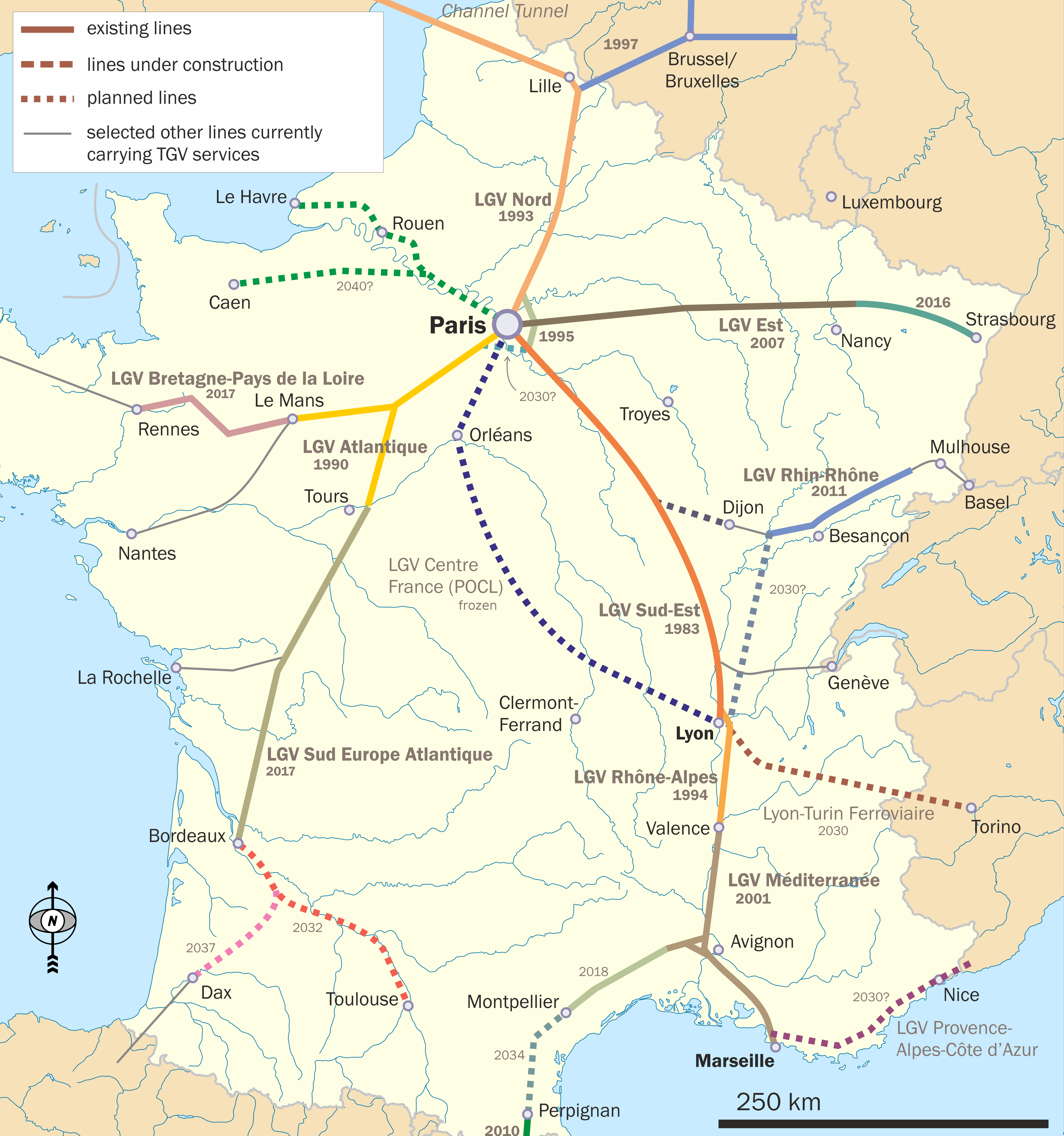
Overview of French TGV lines

In June 2021 there were approximately 2,800 km (1,740 mi) of Lignes à Grande Vitesse (LGV), with four additional line sections under construction. The current lines and those under construction can be grouped into four routes radiating from Paris and one that currently only connects to Paris through a section of classical track:

- South-west: LGV Atlantique, LGV Sud Europe Atlantique and LGV Bretagne-Pays de la Loire to Bordeaux and Rennes.
- North: LGV Nord to Brussels, connecting to High Speed 1 to London and HSL 1 to Brussels.
- East: LGV Est to Strasbourg and Germany.
- South-east: LGV Sud-Est, LGV Rhône-Alpes and LGV Méditerranée to Marseille, plus LGV Rhin-Rhône and LGV Perpignan–Figueres.

LGV Interconnexion Est connects LGV Sud-Est to LGV Nord around Paris.

- East: LGV Rhin-Rhône connects Strasbourg and Lyon, still mostly on classical tracks, and Paris to Besançon and Mulhouse.

=== Existing lines ===
1. LGV Sud-Est (Paris Gare de Lyon to Lyon-Perrache), the first LGV (opened 1981)
2. LGV Atlantique (Paris Gare Montparnasse to Tours and Le Mans) (opened 1990)
3. LGV Rhône-Alpes (Lyon to Valence) (opened 1992)
4. LGV Nord (Paris Gare du Nord to Calais) (opened 1993)
5. LGV Interconnexion Est (LGV Sud-Est to LGV Nord Europe, east of Paris) (opened 1994)
6. LGV Méditerranée (An extension of LGV Rhône-Alpes: Valence to Marseille-Saint-Charles) with a branch to Nîmes (opened 2001)
7. LGV Est (Paris Gare de l'Est to Strasbourg) (first section opened 2007, 2nd section opened 3 July 2016)
8. LGV Perpignan–Figueres (Spain to France) (construction finished 17 February 2009, TGV service from 19 December 2010)
9. LGV Rhin-Rhône (Lyon–Dijon–Mulhouse), first phase opened 11 December 2011.
10. LGV Sud Europe Atlantique (Tours–Bordeaux), extending the southern branch of the LGV Atlantique (also called LGV Sud-Ouest); opened on 2 July 2017.
11. LGV Bretagne-Pays de la Loire (Le Mans–Rennes), extending the western branch of the LGV Atlantique; opened on 2 July 2017.
12. Nîmes-Montpellier bypass extending the south-western stub of the LGV Méditerranée by 60 km towards the Spanish border; opened on 12 December 2017 for freight (July 2018 for passengers). It is however currently limited to a maximum speed of 220 km/h, since the installation of ETCS Level 2 allowing speeds up to 300 km/h is yet to be planned.

Line	Connected cities/stations	Opened	Operating speed (max)	Type of trains
North corridor
LGV Nord	Paris-Nord · Péronne · Arras · Lille-Europe · Calais	1993	300 km/h (190 mph)	Duplex, e300, e320, PBA, PBKA, POS, Réseau
LGV Interconnexion Est	Aéroport Charles de Gaulle · Marne-la-Vallée–Chessy (at Disneyland Paris)	1994	300 km/h (190 mph)	
South-west corridor
LGV Atlantique	Paris-Montparnasse · Massy	1989	300 km/h (190 mph)	Atlantique, Océane
LGV Atlantique	Southern branch: Vendôme · Tours; Western branch: Le Mans	1990	300 km/h (190 mph)	Atlantique, Océane
LGV Sud Europe Atlantique	Poitiers · Angoulême · Bordeaux-Saint-Jean	2017	320 km/h (200 mph)	Atlantique, Océane
LGV Bretagne-Pays de la Loire	Sablé-sur-Sarthe · Laval · Rennes	2017	320 km/h (200 mph)	Atlantique
South-east corridor
LGV Sud-Est	Paris-Lyon · Le Creusot · Mâcon · Lyon-Part-Dieu	1981	300 km/h (190 mph)	Duplex, Euroduplex, Frecciarossa 1000
LGV Rhône-Alpes	Lyon-Saint-Exupéry · Valence	1992	300 km/h (190 mph)	AVE Class 100, Duplex, Frecciarossa 1000
LGV Méditerranée	Avignon · Aix-en-Provence · Marseille-Saint-Charles	2001	320 km/h (200 mph)	AVE Class 100, Duplex, Frecciarossa 1000
LGV Rhin-Rhône	Besançon · Belfort	2011	320 km/h (200 mph)	Duplex, POS, Réseau
LGV Nîmes – Montpellier	Nîmes · Montpellier	2018	220 km/h (140 mph)	AVE Class 100, Duplex
LGV Perpignan–Figueres	Perpignan · Figueres–Vilafant	2010	320 km/h (200 mph)	AVE Class 100, Duplex
East corridor
LGV Est	Paris-Est · Bezannes · Les Trois-Domaines · Louvigny	2007	320 km/h (200 mph)	Duplex, Euroduplex, POS, Réseau, Velaro D
LGV Est	Vendenheim · Strasbourg-Ville	2016	320 km/h (200 mph)	Duplex, Euroduplex, POS, Réseau, Velaro D

=== Under construction ===
1. Lyon–Turin (Lyon–Chambéry–Turin), connecting to the Italian TAV network.

=== Planned lines ===
In 2017 French President Emmanuel Macron announced a plan to "reassess" planned LGV construction, implying that many of the projects listed here will be delayed or not constructed at all. Contrary to this, the French government confirmed 5 new lines in late summer 2018.

1. LGV Montpellier–Perpignan, the last gap in Europe's longest high-speed route between Paris and Málaga/Seville.
2. LGV Bordeaux–Toulouse
3. LGV Provence-Alpes-Côte d'Azur (Marseille–Nice), would reduce Paris–Nice travel times from 5h25 to 3h50.
4. LGV Sud Europe Atlantique Phase 3 (Bordeaux to Spanish Border)
5. LGV Rhin-Rhône (Lyon–Dijon–Mulhouse), second phase of the eastern branch construction initially planned to start in 2014, but funding is unclear for the western and southern branches.
6. Extension to Narbonne of the LGV Bordeaux–Toulouse
7. LGV Picardie (Paris–Amiens–Calais), cutting off the corner of the LGV Nord-Europe via Lille.
8. LGV Normandie would run from Paris to Rouen, Le Havre, Caen and Cherbourg. The line would have a stop in La Défense where it would meet with a proposed link to LGV Nord and a proposed Eurostar service to terminate in La Défense.
9. LGV Paris Orléans Clermont-Ferrand Lyon On 30 July 2010, the government of then President Sarkozy announced that it expected to start work on a second LGV between Paris and Lyon between 2020 and 2030. The train line would run via Orléans and Clermont-Ferrand, at a length of 410 km, and is expected to cost €12bn. The route will be known as LGV POCL (Paris, Orléans, Clermont-Ferrand and Lyon). Four potential routes are being studied as of 2011, with consultations continuing into 2012. Work would not start before 2025.

== Travel times ==
The table shows minimum travel times between cities with direct high-speed trains (note: certain cities are linked by high-speed trains which do not travel at high-speed, for example Bordeaux-Toulouse and Marseille-Nice).

	Bordeaux	Brussels	Geneva	Lille	London	Lyon	Marseille	Nantes	Nice	Paris	Strasbourg	Toulouse
Bordeaux	-	4:07	N/A	4:40	N/A	N/A	N/A	N/A	N/A	2:04	5:42	2:04
Brussels	4:07	-	N/A	0:34	1:55	3:28	5:21	4:59	N/A	1:22	3:48	N/A
Geneva	N/A	N/A	-	N/A	N/A	N/A	N/A	N/A	N/A	3:12	N/A	N/A
Lille	4:40	0:34	N/A	-	1:17	2:57	4:25	4:15	N/A	1:02	2:55	N/A
London	N/A	1:55	N/A	1:17	-	N/A	N/A	N/A	N/A	2:17	N/A	N/A
Lyon	N/A	3:28	N/A	2:57	N/A	-	1:41	4:34	4:31	1:52	3:39	3:57
Marseille	N/A	5:21	N/A	4:25	N/A	1:41	-	6:27	2:38	3:02	5:33	N/A
Nantes	N/A	4:59	N/A	4:15	N/A	4:34	6:27	-	N/A	2:03	5:19	N/A
Nice	N/A	N/A	N/A	N/A	N/A	4:31	2:38	N/A	-	5:50	8:49	N/A
Paris	2:04	1:22	3:12	1:02	2:17	1:52	3:02	2:03	5:50	-	1:55	4:13
Strasbourg	5:42	3:48	N/A	2:55	N/A	3:39	5:33	5:19	8:49	1:55	-	N/A
Toulouse	2:04	N/A	N/A	N/A	N/A	3:57	N/A	N/A	N/A	4:13	N/A	-

== Operations ==
Most TGV operate more or less point to point from Paris to a final destination, or run significant distances from Paris without any stop before they serve a couple of stations. There is no Clock-face scheduling in the sense it is used in Germany, Britain, the Netherlands or Switzerland or for urban rail in France. For example, TGV from Paris to Bordeaux and beyond generally bypass Tours, while some stop at the station of Saint-Pierre-des-Corps, a suburb of Tours. Other TGV serve only Paris to Tours, ending in the central station of Tours. Even Lyon (with a population of 1.4 million people in the Métropole de Lyon) is bypassed by many TGV on their way to the Mediterranean, which rather have a first stop at Avignon TGV or even Marseille, or at Valence TGV for trains to Montpellier. On the other hand, most trains that link Paris with Lyon end at Lyon Perrache station and their majority runs non-stop. LGV bypasses of most cities support this scheme, so that only trains destined to these towns leave the LGV at the respective exit.

Some cities are mostly served by TGVs through so called "beetroot stations" (named after Haute Picardie TGV which was surrounded by sugar beet fields at the time it opened) well outside the built up area but conveniently located along the existing LGV. All this speeds up travel time between Paris and the respective final destinations and probably avoids a lower use of capacity at the far end of train routes, beyond a significant intermediate destination. However, this results in less services between the towns apart from Paris, even if they are situated along the same LGV (e.g. Tours to Bordeaux or Lyon to Marseille), and thus also less suitable interconnections to and between secondary lines.

A few TGV (or their Ouigo substitutes) also bypass Paris when connecting e.g. Bordeaux with Lille, the Mediterranean with Lille, Marseilles with Rennes and Bordeaux with Strasbourg. (All examples from 2021 timetable.) This approach is quite different from the operational scheme of ICE in Germany: German ICE lines usually connect major final stations like Cologne/Düsseldorf, Hamburg, Berlin, Munich and Basel every hour with a couple of intermediate stops, except for trains that would depart too early or arrive too late at the respective ends of the ICE line. To a lesser extent ICEs end or start in towns like Frankfurt, Bremen and Dresden. Large cities along the routes such as Nuremberg, Stuttgart, Frankfurt, Essen, Dortmund, Hannover, Leipzig and Frankfurt and Bremen are served by almost all ICE that pass these towns, whereas bypasses for passenger traffic usually do not exist.

The vast majority of TGVs serving Paris stop at one of the old terminus stations dating back to the 19th century, before the formation of SNCF. Therefore, most trips on the TGV which require a connection in Paris require passengers to travel from one terminus to the other via metro or taxi. This is unlike the situation in Germany with Berlin main station or Austria with Vienna main station (both built in the 21st century) serving virtually all high speed trains in the capital or the situation in Spain where a tunnel linking the former termini Madrid Atocha railway station and Madrid Chamartín railway station in standard gauge allowing through service with high speed trains is under construction.

== See also ==
- High-speed rail in Europe
- Main Line for Europe
- Trans-European Transport Network
