= Perpignan–Barcelona high-speed rail line =

International high-speed rail line

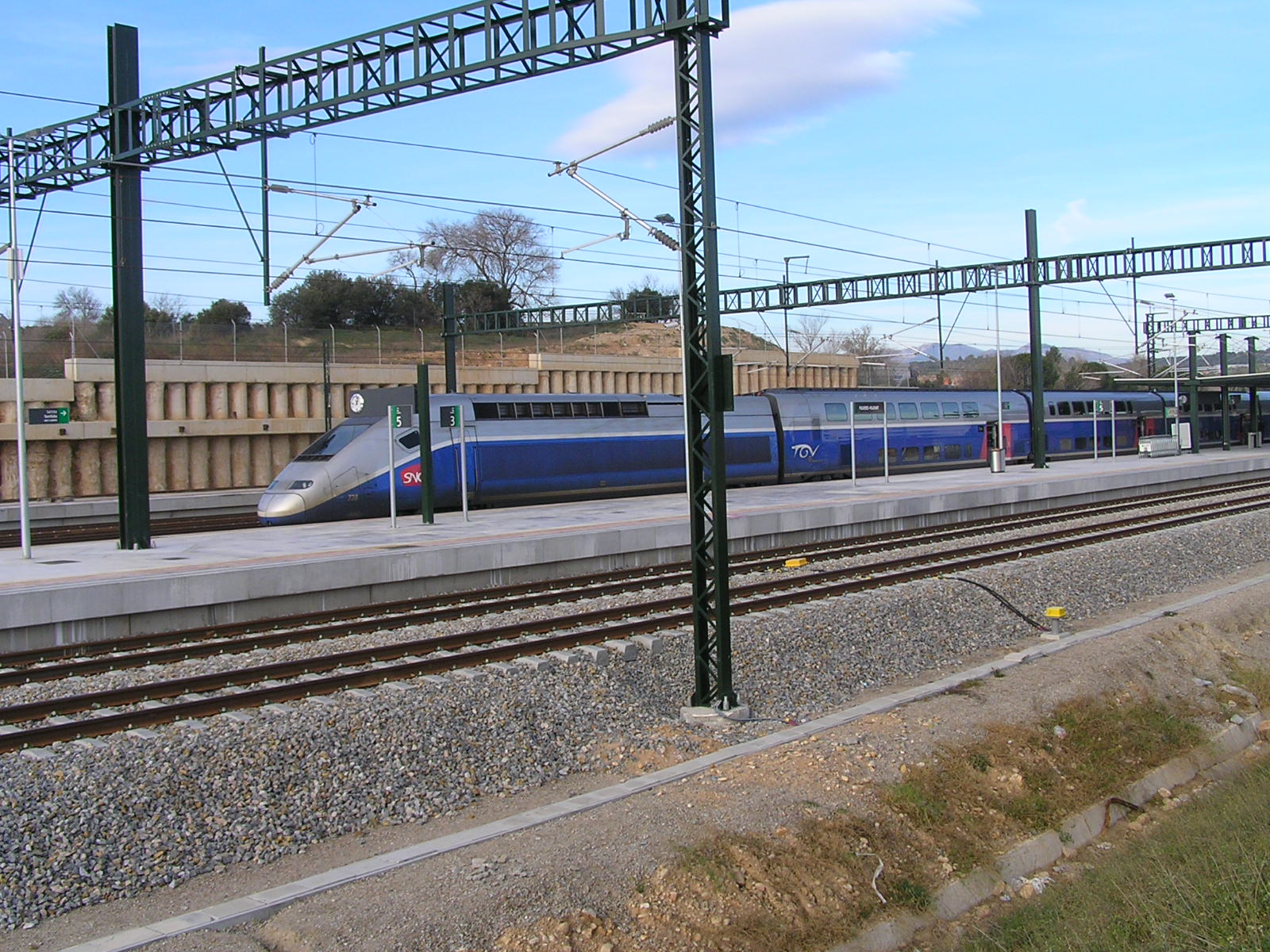
- Figueres–Vilafant railway station: first TGV arrival from Paris, December 2010

Overview
- Status: Operational
- Owner: SNCF Réseau (French side), Adif (Spanish side)
- Locale: France (Occitania), Spain (Catalonia)
- Termini: Gare de Perpignan; Barcelona Sants railway station

Service
- Type: High-speed rail
- System: TGV (in France); Alta Velocidad Española (in Spain)
- Operator(s): SNCF, Renfe
- Rolling stock: SNCF TGV Duplex; AVE Class 100 (from 2014); Renfe Class 252 (freight services)

History
- Opened: 2013

Technical
- Line length: 175.5 km (109.1 mi)
- Number of tracks: Double track
- Track gauge: 1,435 mm (4 ft 8 1/2 in) standard gauge
- Electrification: 25 kV 50 Hz
- Operating speed: Perpignan - Figueres: 300 km/h (190 mph); Figueres - Barcelona: 290 km/h (180 mph)
- Signalling: ERTMS level 2, ASFA

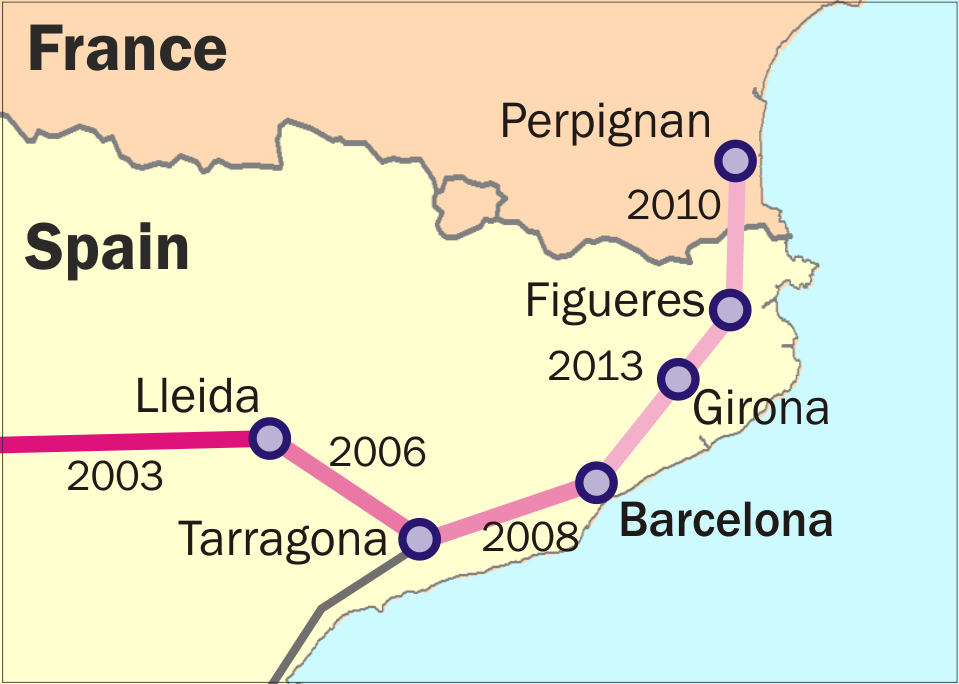
Overview map of the high-speed connections from Barcelona towards France, with the year of opening.

The Perpignan–Barcelona high-speed line is an international high-speed rail line between Perpignan in Roussillon, France and Barcelona in Catalonia, Spain. The line consists of a 175.5-kilometre (109.1 mi) railway, of which 24.6 km (15.3 mi) are in France and 150.8 km (93.7 mi) are in Spain. The line is sometimes referenced as an extension of the Madrid–Barcelona high-speed rail line. The Perpignan–Barcelona line is a part of the Mediterranean Corridor.

During the mid 1990s, both France and Spain resolved to build a high speed crossing of the Pyrenees mountains that separate the two countries; such a line was forecast to secure a 30 per cent share of the land transport market, and be of particular importance to freight movements. On 17 February 2004, a concession was awarded to the TP Ferro consortium, which included the companies Eiffage (France) and ACS / Dragados (Spain), under which the consortium constructed the line at an estimated cost of around €1.1 billion, and was to operate it for 50 years. The most significant civil engineering work on the line was the 8.3-kilometre (5.2 mi) Perthus Tunnel under the Perthus Pass; the line crosses the French–Spanish border within this tunnel. The line uses standard gauge track and 25 kV AC railway electrification at 50 Hz, consistent with the French LGV and Spanish AVE high-speed rail networks.

The line was delivered on 17 February 2009, three months after its connection to the French railway network. However, the first train connection did not take place until 19 December 2010 due to delays in the delivery of the Figueres station. The first service to Barcelona was conducted on 9 January 2013 after the completion of the Figueres-Barcelona line. During 2014, the concessionaire's financial situation deteriorated. The collected tolls were insufficient to repay its creditors the sum of €500 million; a liquidation order for TP Ferro was issued two years later. The line is now operated by France and Spain via the Railway infrastructure managers SNCF Réseau and Adif.

== History ==
=== Background ===
Between the states of France and Spain lies a natural barrier in the form of the Pyrenees mountain range, a geographic feature has been a historic challenge to cross-border traffic. By the 1990s, increasing cross-border activity was being constrained by congestion on the existing road and air links. Furthermore, officials recognised that the existing conventional cross-border line, which involved a break of gauge, was far slower than new infrastructure would have been. Railway planners proposed two different cross-border high speed rail lines traversing the Pyrenees; the Figueres-Perpignan route towards the Mediterranean being one while the other, between Dax and Vitoria, was closer to the Atlantic. During 1992, the governments of France and Spain began to discuss options for improving cross-border connectivity via the creation of a new international railway between the two countries to accommodate high volume of traffic that had been projected.

On 10 October 1995, both governments signed the Madrid agreement, formally declaring their intention to build a double tracked standard gauge high speed line through the Pyrenees between Perpignan (France) and Figueres (Spain). During the following year, the scheme became one of 20 priority projects highlighted under the wider Trans-European Transport Network (TEN-T) programme. Prior to the project's launch, extensive surveying efforts were conducted to support the line's future construction.

While the forecasted passenger figures on their own did not justify construction of the line, the need for effective freight movements via a modern fast line was apparent; while annual freight traffic between Spain and the rest of Europe had reached 144 million tonnes by 1998, rail freight across all of the four conventional lines then available comprised just three per cent of that total. It was anticipated that the rail link would promptly achieve a 30 per cent share of the land transport market across the Pyrenees; traffic in the first year of operations alone was expected to be around 3.5 million passengers and 4.2 million tonnes of freight.

=== Selection and construction ===
During 2002, following a competitive bidding process, it was announced that the Euroferro consortium, comprising Bouygues and Dragados, had been selected as the preferred bidder to construct the line. However, negotiations between the consortium and the two national governments ultimately broke down and the whole process was annulled in 2003. Furthermore, legal action had been threatened by one of the unsuccessful bidders against both governments and the consortium over alleged discrepancies in the bidding process. Shortly thereafter, the tendering process was relaunched with a tighter specification and a less flexible contract model along with additional stipulations pertaining to both negotiation and strict deadlines. While the second tender was more coldly received by the industry, attracting only three consortia, the negotiation process was relatively fast.

On 17 February 2004, a contract for the construction of the line was awarded to the TP Ferro consortium, a joint venture of Eiffage (France) and Dragados (Spain). The group constructed the line for an estimated cost of approximately €1.1 billion, and was to operate it for 53 years. It received a public subsidy of €540 million, split between the European Union, France and Spain. The European Union also provided 25 percent of the cost of the original construction works.

From the onset, the construction timeline was particularly stringent, although considerable planning had been completed beforehand; this hastiness was politically driven, partially due to the either nation being obligated to pay an indemnity to the concessionaire for failures that resulted in the project overrunning its established opening date. At the height of construction activity, in excess of 1,500 workers are employed in the project; work was performed in shifts across all hours of the day. The financing arrangements were particularly complex, incorporating a public–private partnership (PPP), the involvement of 18 banks, and a €540 million subsidy; however, there were no minimum usage or similar such guarantees imposed on either SNCF and Renfe or the two governments.

The most challenging single piece of civil engineering in the line's construction of the project was the twin bore Perthus Tunnel, which had a length of 8.3 kilometres (5.2 mi) under the Perthus Pass. Various other bridges, tunnels, and miscellaneous civil engineering works were also required, however their cost was dwarfed by that of the tunnel ($375 million) by a considerable margin. On 19 July 2005, construction of the tunnel was officially launched at a ceremony attended by both French and Spanish dignitaries. Much of the excavation was performed by a pair of tunnel boring machines (TBMs).

=== Testing and opening ===
During November 2008, test running commenced; the international section was officially opened on 17 February 2009. However, the running of services were delayed until December 2010 because the station at Figueres was not finished. Services in the section started on 19 December 2010 with a TGV service from Paris via Perpignan to Figueres–Vilafant and regular freight traffic started on 21 December 2010. Eventually the 44.5-kilometre (27.7 mi) international section was officially inaugurated on 27 January 2011.

However, the delay in the opening of the natural extension of the line between Figueres and Barcelona led to lower traffic than expected and therefore to lower revenues for the concessionaire, which was generated via a toll system. During early 2014, the concessionaire experienced a catastrophic financial situation as the collected tolls were insufficient to repay the €500 million which had been borrowed from various banks. In July 2015, the company announced that it was insolvent; on 15 September 2016, the court of Girona ordered the liquidation of TP Ferro. As a consequence, France and Spain, through the Railway infrastructure managers SNCF Réseau and Adif, took over operations of the line, as well as the debt. This takeover took place on 21 December 2016, by the joint subsidiary "Línia Figueres-Perpinyà" (or "Línea Figueras Perpignan S.A."), created on 21 October 2016.

== Line ==
The track on the new line is standard gauge using 25 kV AC railway electrification at 50 Hz, consistent with the French LGV and Spanish AVE high-speed rail networks. The line is used by both passenger and freight trains, the maximum grade being limited to 12 ‰. The design speed is 350 kilometres per hour (220 mph). The line's design was heavily shaped by its need to accommodate freight trains; this can be seen in its use of gentler gradients than those typically found on the average LGV line.

This line was the first rail connection between Spain and the rest of Europe constructed without a break-of-gauge and the first international connection to the standard-gauge Spanish AVE network. Traditional Spanish rail lines are broad gauge based on the Spanish vara 1,668 mm (5 ft 5 21/32 in), so rail connections between France and Spain have traditionally involved a break-of-gauge, implying that passengers and cargo must either change trains, or the trains must pass through gauge-changing installations at the border. Another same-gauge connection to France is planned near the Atlantic coast in the Basque country, and a third link via Huesca crossing the central Pyrenees mountains through a 40 kilometres (25 mi) tunnel is under study.

France has left-hand traffic for trains and Spain right-hand one, so a flyover was built around 10 kilometres (6.2 mi) north of the border (42.55929°N 2.85120°E).

=== Perpignan - Figueres line ===
The line from Perpignan to Figueres is a mixed-traffic high-speed railway (that is allowing passenger trains and freight trains) of 44.4 km (27.6 mi), including 24.6 km (15.3 mi) on the French side and 19.8 km (12.3 mi) on the Spanish side, with UIC standard gauge. The design speed (or maximum nominal speed) of this line is 350 km/h (220 mph) but the maximal commercial speed is currently 300 km/h (190 mph). The railway crosses the French–Spanish border via the Perthus Tunnel, an 8.3 km (5.2 mi) tunnel bored under the Perthus Pass.

This line constitutes line no. 837 000 of the French national rail network, under the name "Ligne de Perpignan à Figueras (LGV)", although it is not legally part of it.

=== Figueres - Barcelona line ===
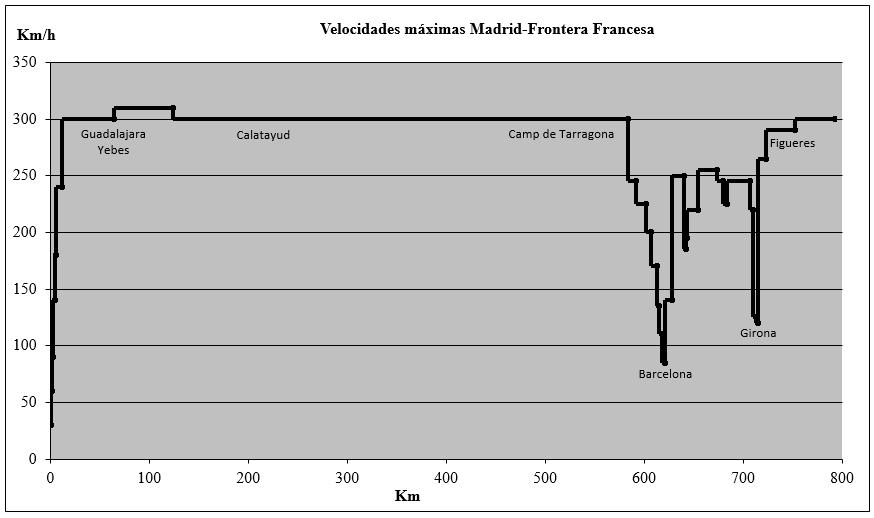
Maximum speed profile of the "Madrid-Barcelona-French Border" line, in 2015.

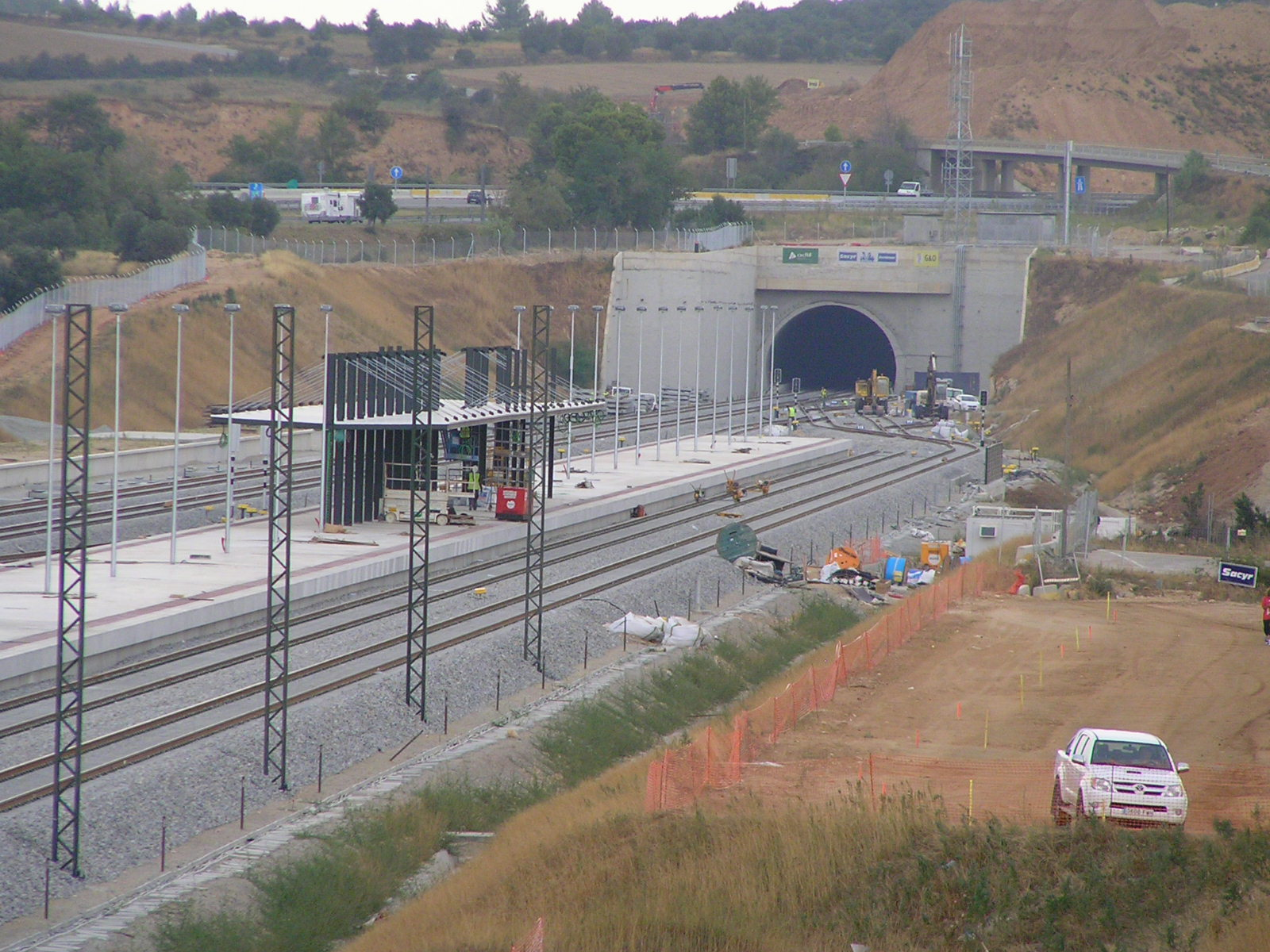
Figueres-Vilafant railway station under construction in August 2010. French TGVs from Paris terminated here between 2011 and 2013, connecting with a Spanish train to Barcelona

This 131 km (81.4 mi) line is part of the Spanish "Madrid-Barcelona-French Border" line. It is also a mixed-traffic high-speed railway, with an operating speed of up to 290 km/h (180 mph).

The Spanish 131-kilometre (81.4 mi) Barcelona–Figueres section was originally planned to open in 2009, however, delays were encountered during the building of a 4-kilometre tunnel in Girona, the first phase of which was finished in September 2010, as well as controversy over the route between Sants and Sagrera stations in Barcelona. The section was eventually completed in January 2013 at a cost of €3.7 billion and the entire line officially opened on 8 January 2013. This connected for the first time the Spanish AVE high-speed network with the French TGV high-speed network.

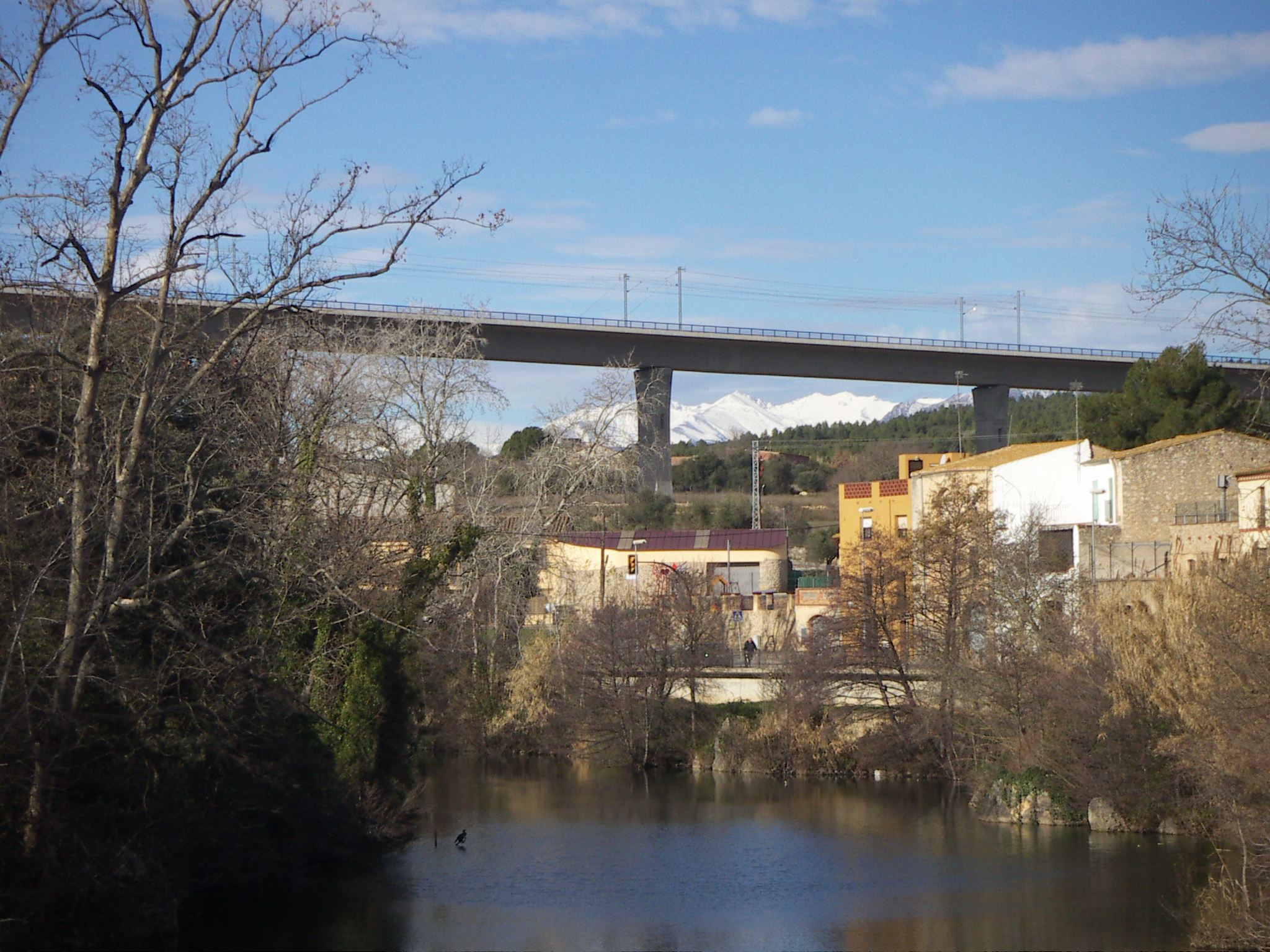
Muga Viaducto in the Pont de Molins village, without noise protection screens

== Services ==
A TGV service from Paris via Perpignan started on 19 December 2010 to a temporary station at Figueres and a connecting service on the classic line on to Barcelona and Madrid. The total journey time from Paris to Barcelona has been reduced by 1h 15m to 7h 25m (current Paris-Barcelona travel time by train is 6h 41m). Of that, 5h 30m was spent on the Paris to Figueres segment. Initially there was a service of two Paris-Figueres TGVs per day, which connected with two Renfe Alvia trains a day between Barcelona and Figueres via the conventional broad gauge line and a temporary double gauge track. From January 2013 there was a service of nine Renfe AVE trains a day between Figueres and Barcelona with eight services continuing on to Madrid.

Renfe started a standard-gauge freight service on 21 December 2010. As of January 2011 four freight trains a week run over the line from Barcelona, with journey times reduced by 6 hours: one train each way to Lyon, and one each way to Milan.

On 28 November 2013, Renfe and SNCF announced the opening of direct long-distance services from 15 December 2013, with daily SNCF TGV Euroduplex trains between Paris – Barcelona, and AVE Renfe 100 series trains for the routes Toulouse – Barcelona, Lyon – Barcelona, Marseille – Madrid, based on a commercial agreement between the two companies in a cooperation called Elipsos. However, since the start of the COVID-19 pandemic in 2019, only the trains linking Barcelona with Paris and Barcelona with Lyon were running with one daily train in each direction. In February 2022 SNCF announced the break up of the company Elipsos and since then the French operator relaunched its high-speed service between Paris and Barcelona on its own under the TGV inOui brand with the timetable change in December 2022. This Barcelona-Paris remained for a while the only high-speed service in operation between the two countries, until Renfe introduced its own new services on the routes Barcelona-Lyon from 13 July 2023 and Madrid-Marseille from 28 July 2023.

As of January 2013 there are eight trains a day running from Madrid, connecting at Figueres Vilafant with two TGV services to Paris. Since December 2013, the journey time for the TGV Paris–Barcelona service has been 6 hours 25 minutes.

== Expansion ==
=== Operating ===
Lyon to Barcelona is expected to take less than four hours using the standard line in France between Perpignan and Nîmes. A new company jointly owned by RENFE and SNCF is to be formed to run services between Paris and Madrid. Ten new trains are to be purchased at a cost of €300 million.

Tendering for the Nîmes–Montpellier bypass route started in May 2010. This is the first stage in the link between the Spanish high-speed network and LGV Méditerranée and the line will carry a mix of freight and high-speed trains. A 25-year Public–Private Partnership agreement was signed in June 2012, construction works completed in December 2017 and the first passenger services to Montpellier Sud de France station commenced on 7 July 2018.

=== Future ===
Work on the 150 kilometres (93 mi) LGV Montpellier–Perpignan is expected to start in 2029 beginning with the Montpellier-Béziers section. Public consultation took place in beginning 2015 and the preliminary high-speed route and station locations were approved by the French transport ministry in February 2016. Initial construction plans for the Montpellier-Béziers section forecast the construction to last 10 years plus another 10 years for the Béziers-Perpignan section. Financing for the project was agreed in January 2022 while a special purpose body to oversee delivery, financing and project management was formed in March 2022. The 54 kilometres (34 mi) Montpellier-Béziers section is now expected to be operational by 2034 with the Béziers - Perpignan section to follow construction by end 2039 and be completed by 2044. For the second section a new public consultation is expected to begin in the fall of 2025. The total cost of the project is 6 billion euros.

== See also ==
- High-speed rail in Spain
- TGV
- Alta Velocidad Española (AVE) - Spanish high-speed train service
