= Perthus Tunnel =

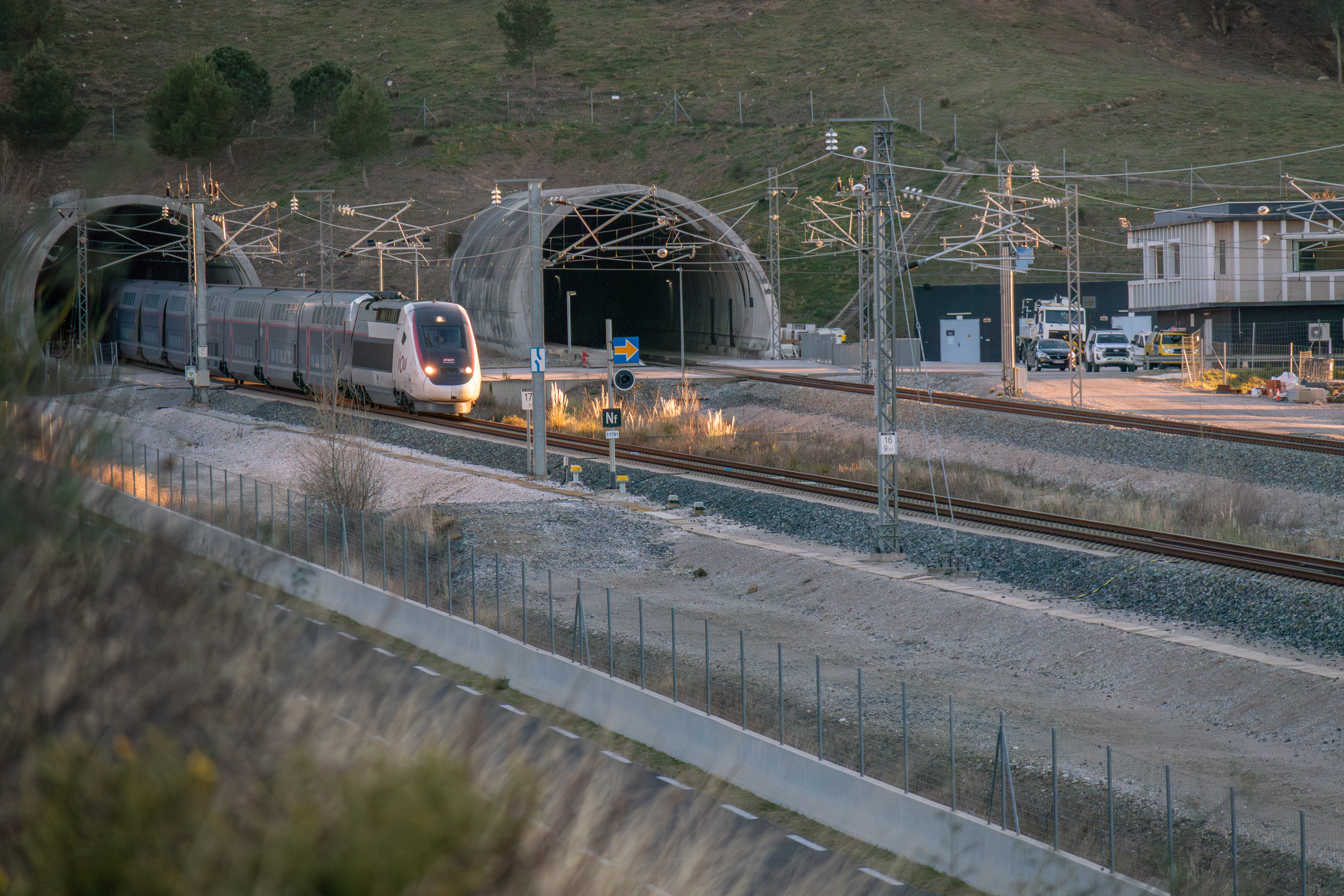
- An Euroduplex train exiting the Perthus tunnel
- Interactive map of Perthus Tunnel

Overview
- Line: LGV Perpignan–Figueres
- Location: Border between France and Spain
- Coordinates: 42°28′N 2°52′E
- Status: Active
- Start: La Jonquera: 42°26′49″N 2°51′43″E
- End: Montesquieu-des-Albères: 42°31′14″N 2°51′34″E

Operation
- Constructed: 2005-2009
- Opened: 19 December 2010
- Operator: TP Ferro

Technical
- Line length: 8.3-kilometre (5.2 mi)

The Perthus Tunnel is a twin-bore railway tunnel between France and Spain under the Eastern Pyrenees, built as part of the high-speed railway line Perpignan-Figueres. It has made possible the implementation of direct high-speed trains connecting the two countries' railway systems since December 2013, linking the Spanish AVE network with the French TGV. The tunnel is named after the nearby border town of Le Perthus.

The Perthus Tunnel was built between July 2005 and February 2009, and it first opened to traffic on December 19, 2010. It was designed, built, and operated under a 50-year concession by the TP Ferro consortium. The tunnel has been designed to allow the movement of freight trains as well as high-speed passenger traffic. It also facilitates the full interoperability of qualifying trains from either the Spanish or the French network without distinction. It is 8.3 kilometres (5.2 mi) long. During late 2016, TP Ferro went into liquidation, leading to a new company jointly held by Administrador de Infraestructuras Ferroviarias (ADIF) and SNCF Réseau becoming responsible for the tunnel's operation.

== Construction ==
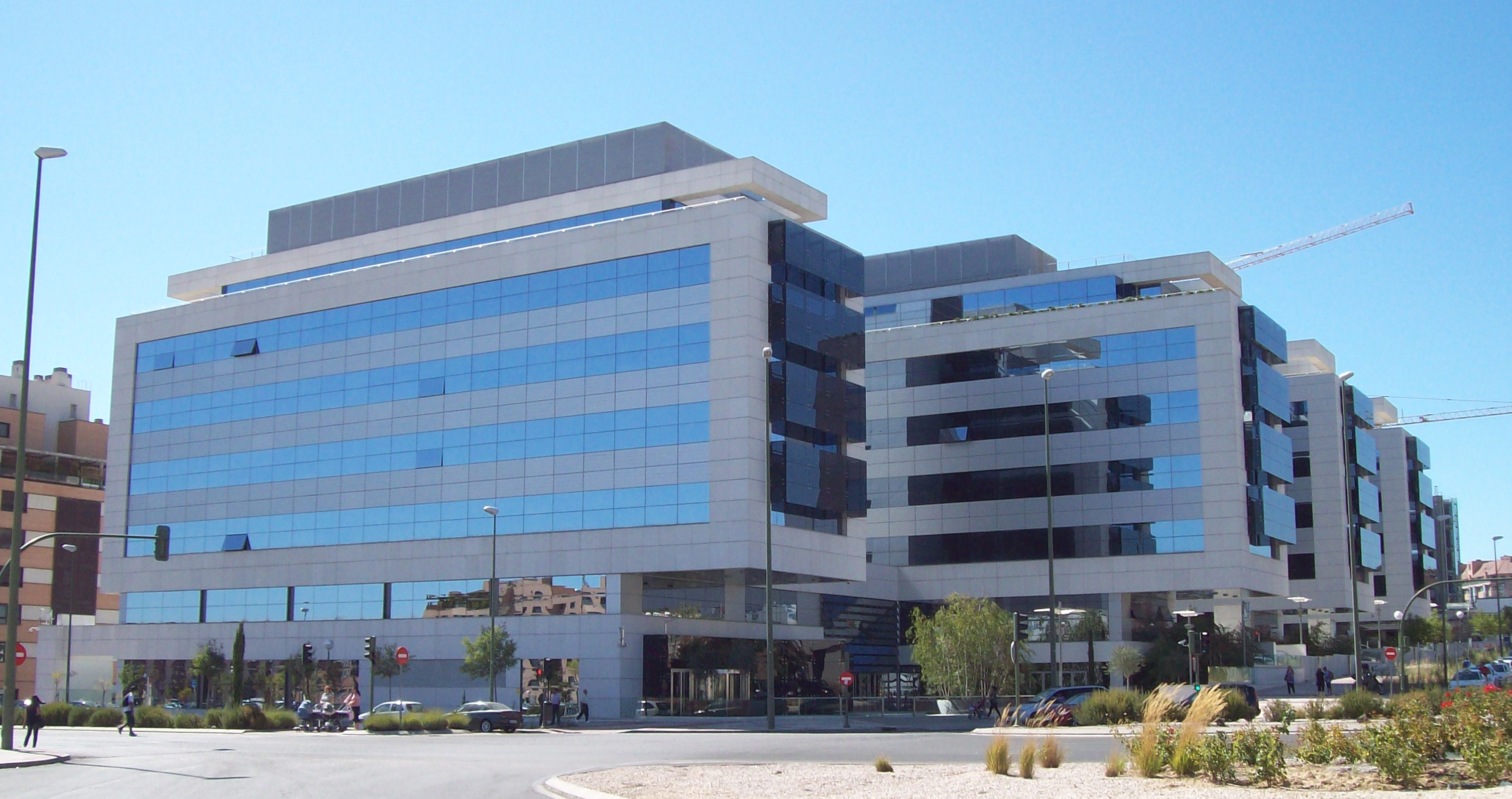
Dragados, a Spanish Company, in Madrid

As early as the 1980s, studies were underway into examining the potential of constructing a high speed railway between the countries of Spain and France. By the 21st century, various projects to improve the connecting infrastructure between European nations were underway. To facilitate any such link between Spain and France, the challenging terrain of the Pyrenees would have to be traversed, necessitating the construction of a tunnel. During the early 2000s, arrangements to undertake its design and construction were explored. This resulted in the formation of a public–private partnership venture by the TP Ferro consortium, a joint venture of the French civil engineering firm Eiffage and the Spanish company Dragados, who undertook the design, construction, and operation of the Perthus Tunnel under a fifty-year concession awarded in December 2003.

The Perthus Tunnel, which comprises two parallel bores with a length of 8.3 kilometres (5.2 mi), was considered to be the most challenging undertaking of the project. Of the various bridges, tunnels, and miscellaneous civil engineering works needed to produce the connection, the tunnel was both the largest and comprised the greatest expense by a considerable margin; the estimated cost of its construction was $375M. In the years prior to the project's launch, extensive surveying efforts had been conducted to support the future construction effort. On 17 February 2004, the final contract between TP Ferro, France, and Spain was agreed. On 19 July 2005, construction of the tunnel was officially launched at a ceremony attended by both French and Spanish dignitaries.

TP Ferro determined that a pair of tunnel boring machines (TBMs) would be compatible with the geological features present, which mainly comprised hard granite, granodiorite, gneiss, scists, mylorite, and diorite, along the tunnel's route. The early excavation work involved the preparation of the tunnel's southern portal, which included the construction of a platform as well as reinforcement of the opening, after which both TBMs commenced boring from the Spanish side. As the TBMS progressed, they installed a precast concrete lining, consisting of six segments plus a key per ring. Spoil was removed via a conveyor system running back to the tunnel portals. Concrete was produced in an on-site batch plant setup outside the southern tunnel portals and conveyed by a specialised fleet of ten mixer trucks. A total of four equipment galleries are present along the tunnel. The usable cross-section of each bore is 50m2.

Perthus Tunnel was constructed to conform with relatively rigorous safety standards. As such, various safety systems are present, such equipment includes a backup power supply, smoke detectors, fire suppression apparatus, high pressure water lines, sewage and ventilation systems, active monitoring of clearances and falling objects, as well as numerous connections between the twin bores at regular intervals of 350m. Emergency provisions near the entrances of the tunnel include a designated access points and a purpose-built helicopter landing area.

On 1 October 2007, it was announced that the first TBM had achieved breakthrough; this was several months later than planned due to a fault being discovered. Following less than four years of construction work, the Perthus Tunnel was declared to have been completed on 17 February 2009.

== Operations ==
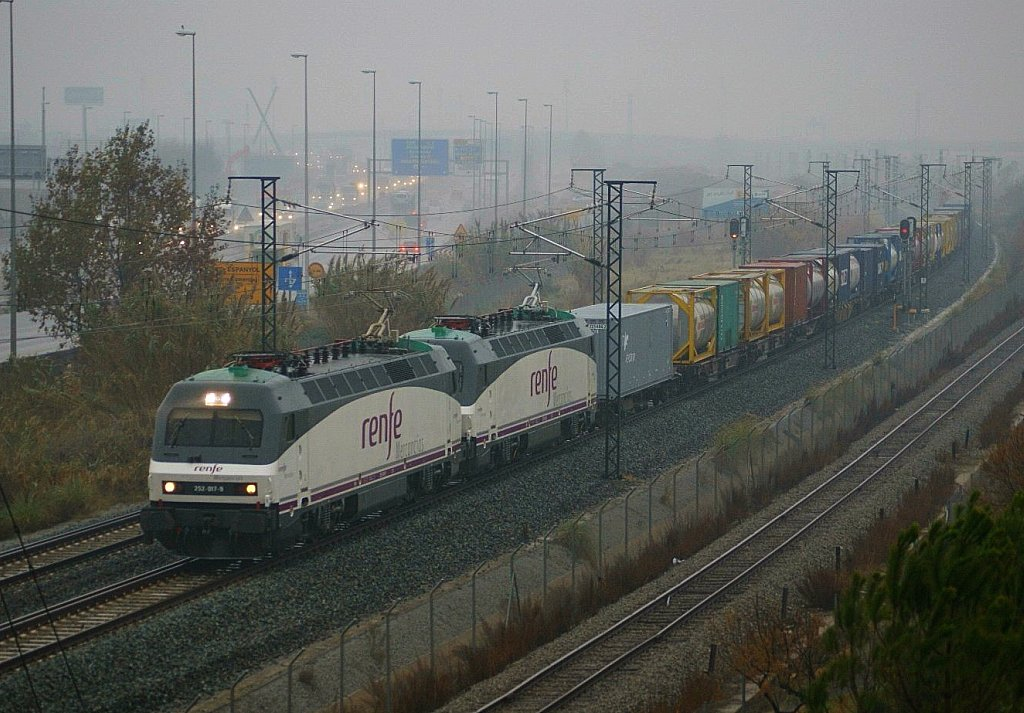
The Barcelyon Express

On 19 December 2010, Perthus Tunnel was opened to traffic. The newly opened route was promptly used by the Barcelyon Express, a Franco-Spanish combined transport service operated by Naviland Cargo (SNCF Geodis group) and Renfe Operadora. The joint Franco-Spanish high speed passenger service operator Elipsos also commenced use of the tunnel. At the time of the opening, the high-speed standard gauge railway ended at Figueres-Vilafant station; an Iberian gauge spur line had been purpose-built from the conventional Barcelona-Figueres line to serve this station. As a means of compensation for the delay in the tunnel's opening, the concession held by TP Ferro was extended by three years.

During November 2009, formal design studies for a high-speed Perpignan-Montpellier line were launched by Réseau Ferré de France. The completed Perthus Tunnel forms one part of the 44.4-kilometre (27.6 mi) Perpignan-Figueres high-speed railway. The high-speed line between Barcelona and Figueres was opened to traffic on 8 January 2013; however, prior to December of that year, passengers had to change trains at Figueres Vilafant station, from a French TGV to a Spanish AVE, as neither trainset was approved for use on the other country's network. Finally, direct trains were launched on 15 December 2013. As a consequence of these additional developments, the new high speed route enables high speed TGV service to travel between Barcelona and Perpignan in only 50 minutes, one third of the travel time of the historic line.

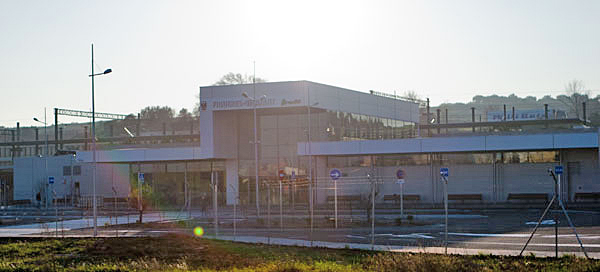
Figueres-Vilafant Train station, connected to the Perthus Tunnel

During late 2016, TP Ferro, the consortium operating Perthus Tunnel, went into liquidation. Consequently, all staff and activities previously undertaken by TP Ferro were taken over by a new company jointly formed by Administrador de Infraestructuras Ferroviarias (ADIF) and SNCF Réseau; operations of the tunnel have continued without disruption.

In 2024, the tunnel fees for Perthus tunnel transiting were cut by 90 percent due to subsidies from the French and Spanish governments, resulting in a major increase in traffic.
