= LGV Provence-Alpes-Côte d'Azur =

Future French high-speed railway

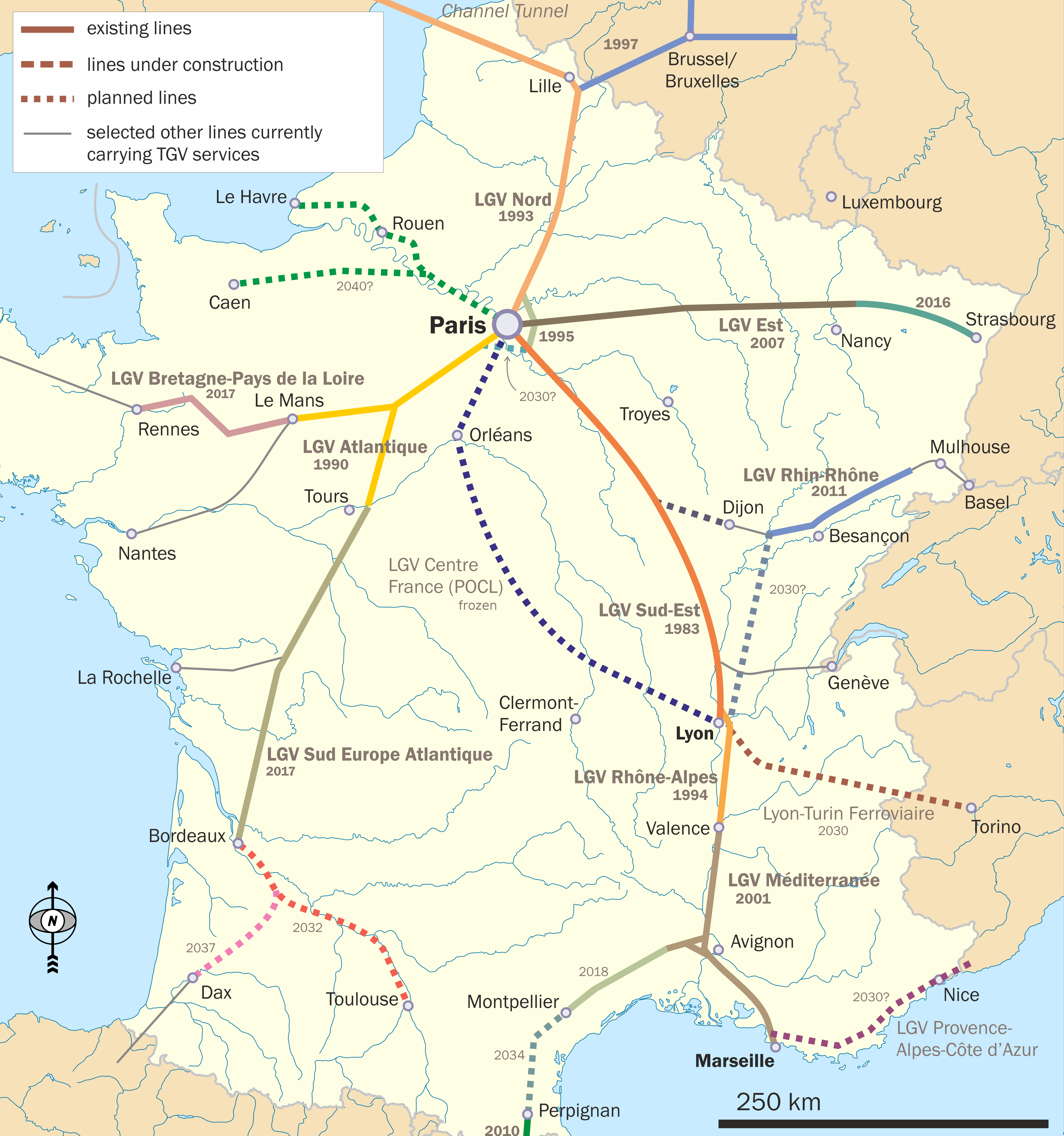
The LGV PACA on a map of France (bottom right)

The LGV Provence-Alpes-Côte d'Azur (LGV PACA), also referred to in French as the Ligne nouvelle Provence-Alpes-Côte d'Azur (LN PACA) or LGV Côte d'Azur, is a French high-speed rail project intended to extend the LGV Méditerranée which ends in Marseille toward the French Riviera. It would offer faster journey times between Monaco, Nice, Cannes, Toulon and the north and southwest of the country than the current Marseille–Ventimiglia railway, opened in the 19th century.

The project is divided in four phases; two phases are currently funded. Construction work started in 2025 at Marseille-Saint-Charles station amid a visit by President Emmanuel Macron.

== Route ==
Three principal route options were considered, mainly concerning the alignment between the cities of Avignon, Aix-en-Provence, Toulon and Draguignan.

- The option providing the most time saving between Nice and Avignon would have used the speed of the Paris–Nice connection to offer the largest potential clientele base to compete with one of the strongest internal air traffic routes
- The northernmost route would have been the shortest between Avignon and Nice and may have a station serving the pôle scientifique close to Cadarache
- The longest route studied (the southernmost, known as the coastal route) was via Marseille and Toulon, offering the quickest travel time between Marseille and Nice (1 hour and 10 minutes)

Additional connections between the Mediterranean coast between Barcelona, Montpellier, Marseille, Nice and Genoa and the southern cross route towards Toulouse and Bordeaux would be affected; the new line would link Marseille to Genoa in 3hrs 15mins, and Barcelona in 3hrs 35mins (with the LGV Perpignan–Figueres).

The final route alignment decision and its details were announced by Ecology Minister Jean-Louis Borloo on 30 June 2009, opting for the longest route via Marseille, Toulon, and Nice, serving the three large cities.

== Controversy ==
This project was subject to public debate between 21 February and 8 July 2005.

There was much local opposition to the project, particularly by various environmental organisations. Additionally, differences of opinion due to the vested interests of the three departments concerned (Bouches-du-Rhône, Var and Alpes-Maritimes) caused friction. Local elected officials have approved the project and the presidents of the general committees of the three departments have agreed to propose an alternative route in order to reconcile their respective positions.

== Progress ==
The Conseil d'orientation des infrastructures (a council convened by Transport Minister Élisabeth Borne to examine future rail projects in France after the inauguration of Emmanuel Macron) recommended taking forward a new line between Marseille and Nice as a priority. The project was divided in four phases; two phases are funded. Construction work on phase 1 started in Marseille in 2025. Work on phase 2 is scheduled to begin in 2027–2028.

== See also ==
- LGV Méditerranée
- LGV Perpignan–Figueres
