= Contournement Nîmes – Montpellier =

French high-speed railway

Coordinates: 43.8131°N 4.50203°E

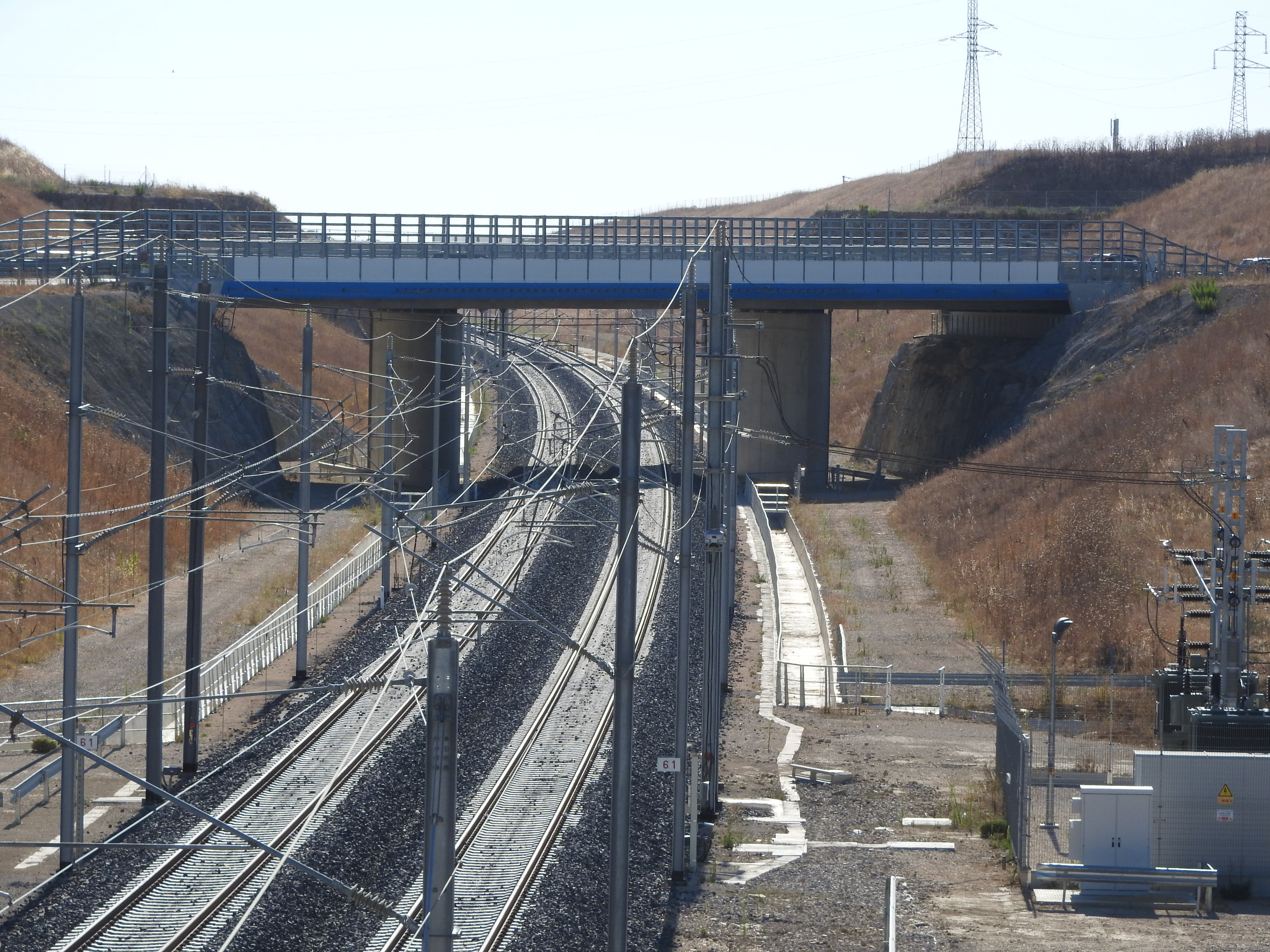
- The line in Lunel, Hérault

Overview
- Status: Operational
- Owner: SNCF Réseau
- Locale: Occitania, France
- Termini: Nîmes; Montpellier
- Stations: 2

Service
- System: SNCF
- Operator: SNCF

History
- Opened: 10 December 2017 (freight service); 7 July 2018 (passenger service)

Technical
- Line length: 80 km (50 mi)
- Num of tracks: Double track
- Track gauge: 1,435 mm (4 ft 8 1/2 in) standard gauge
- Electrification: 25 kV 50 Hz
- Operating speed: 220 km/h (140 mph)
- Signalling: KVB, ERTMS Level 2

The Contournement Nîmes – Montpellier (English: "Nîmes – Montpellier Bypass"), also known as the LGV Nîmes–Montpellier (French: LGV for ligne à grande vitesse), is a French high-speed railway line, bypassing the cities of Nîmes and Montpellier in Southern France. It has the distinction of being the first ligne à grande vitesse to be intentionally built for mixed passenger and freight traffic.

The programme was developed with the aim of providing the capacity for several new passenger services, including a 30% increase in the frequency of regional trains, as well as additional freight traffic. Additional benefits include a reduction in travel times for both national and international traffic traversing the route. The line is planned for mixed-use traffic by both TGV trains and freight. The Nîmes – Montpellier Bypass provides access onto the Spanish rail network as well as the proposed mixed LGV Montpellier–Perpignan, a new high-speed line between Montpellier and Perpignan. The journey from Montpellier to Paris takes less than three hours on the new line. In June 2012, SNCF Réseau entered a 25-year public-private partnership with the OC’VIA consortium for the financing, designing, building and maintenance of the line.

On 10 December 2017, the first commercial freight train used the route. The first passenger services to Montpellier Sud de France station commenced on 7 July 2018; full service to the station began on 15 December 2019 with the opening of Nîmes–Pont du Gard station.

== Construction ==
=== Purpose ===
The Nîmes–Montpellier bypass was developed initially by French railway infrastructure manager SNCF Réseau, and later in conjunction with the OC’VIA consortium under a public-private partnership arrangement. Companies involved in the OC’VIA consortium include Bouygues Construction, Colas, SPIE Batignolles, Alstom Transport, Meridiam infrastructure, and the Public-Private Partnership Investment and Development Funds (FIDEPPP). The programme has been allocated €2.28 billion of funding. Reportedly, the construction process shall support approximately 30,000 jobs.

One stated aim of the programme is to provide capacity for several new services, including a 30 per cent increase in the frequency of regional train services; it also reduces travelling times for both national and international trips using the route. Specifically, the Nîmes and Montpellier bypass shall provide access onto the Spanish rail network via the Perpignan–Figueras line and to the Barcelona–Genoa corridor as well as the proposed new mixed high-speed line between Montpellier and Perpignan. It shall also increase freight capacity; it is anticipated that it the effect of taking roughly 3,000 trucks off the roads on each day and double the freight traffic using the railway within the space of ten years.

The Nîmes–Montpellier bypass is part of a bigger project, known as Priority Project 3, which has the objective of creating a railway network that connects Portugal, Spain and the rest of Europe. Major elements of the programme include the extension of France's high-speed railway network to better serve the whole Languedoc-Roussillon region, as well as a new Montpellier–Perpignan line, and providing a link between France and Spain. The journey from Montpellier to Paris is expected to take less than three hours on the new line.

=== Organisation and financing ===
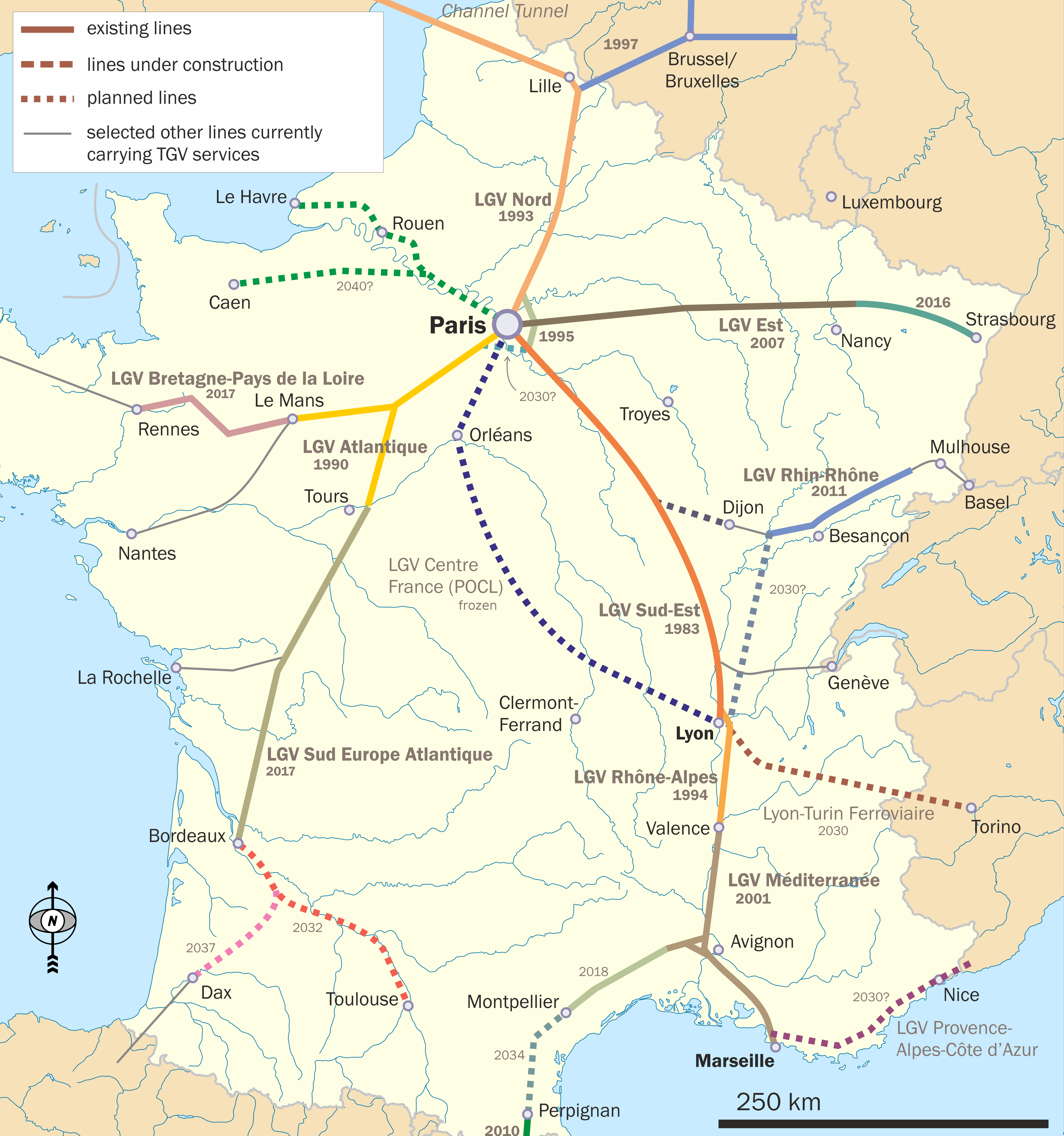
Overall TGV system map showing the general route of the Nîmes – Montpellier Bypass and connections with other lines.

In 2005, a déclaration d'utilité publique was passed; by May 2009, three bids had been received, out of which in January 2012, a joint venture led by Bouygues in cooperation with Setec, Systra and SGTE was selected to build the railway at a cost of €2.06 billion. Overall, the financing of the bypass programme is provided through a combination of public and private funding, the OC’VIA consortium contributed €1.5 billion ($1.87 billion) of privately raised funds themselves. The public funding is being provided by a combination of several bodies, including the French government, the Languedoc Roussillon Regional Council, multiple municipal authorities of Nîmes and Montpellier, the Gard General Council, the European Union, and SNCF Réseau.

In June 2012, SNCF Réseau entered a 25-year public-private partnership with OC’VIA for the financing, designing, building and maintaining of the line. Under the terms of this agreement, SNCF Réseau is responsible for the management of regulation, operational management of rail traffic and operation of the network and its technical installations. Meanwhile, Oc’Via established two subsidiaries, namely Oc’Via Construction, who performed the design and construction of the line, and Oc’Via Maintenance, which is responsible for the route's maintenance upon its commissioning. Under the terms of the agreement signed in June 2012, construction of the line was to start during late 2013 or early 2014 after 18 months of permitting and land acquisition. As scheduled, all work was to be completed by December 2017 while the opening to passenger services was not expected to occur before July 2018. The LGV Montpellier–Perpignan extension towards the LGV Perpignan–Figueres and the Spanish high speed network is unlikely to be started until well after 2020.

Various contractors have been involved with the Nîmes-Montpellier bypass. OC’VIA Construction awarded a contract to TERRASOL for conducting preliminary and detailed design studies for the project, this company had previously participated in the submission of the proposal for the HSL project. Later on, SYSTRA was awarded the design and construction contract and is in charge of the integrated project management, along with SETEC, while Egis-group is engaged to provide project management assistance services. Société Générale serves as the programme's financial advisor, as well as the mandated lead arranger, hedge provider and security agent for the OC’VIA consortium.

== Route ==
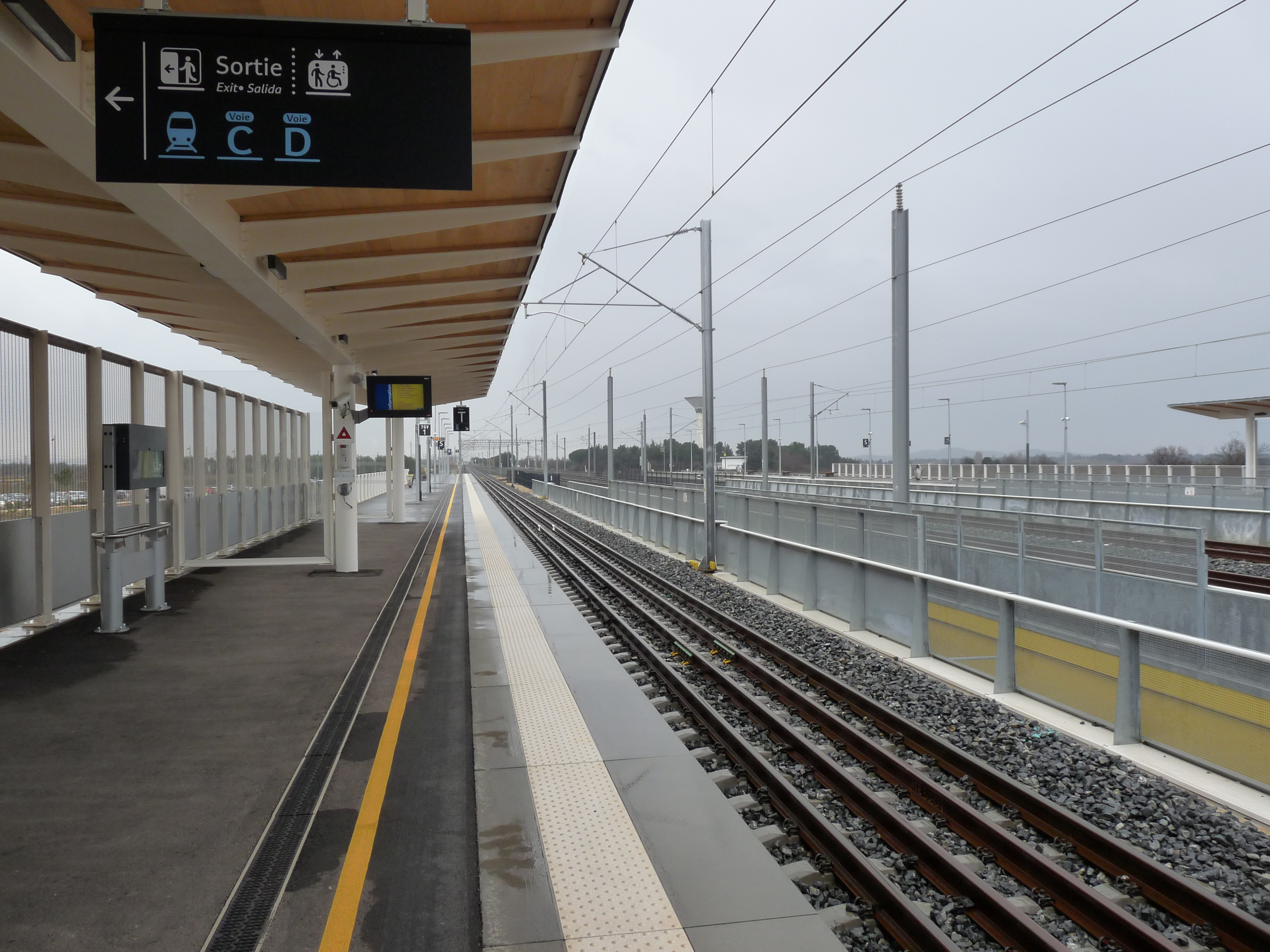
Nîmes–Pont du Gard station

The programme involved the construction of 80 km (50 mi) of brand new track, including 60 km (37 mi) of high-speed line between Manduel and Lattes, an additional 10 km (6.2 mi) along the right bank of the Rhône, and another 10 km (6.2 mi) connecting Jonquières, Lattes and Manduel. In order to construct this line, approximately 145 engineering structures, including seven viaducts, were completed. The maximum operating speed on the line will initially be restricted to 220 km/h (140 mph), and later be raised to 300 km/h (190 mph), for passenger trains, while freight trains are to be allowed to traverse it at up to 120 km/h (75 mph). The line is used by both TGV trains and freight, connecting to the LGV Méditerranée as well as extending it southwest towards the LGV Perpignan–Figueres.

As the existing city centre stations were expected to be unable to cope with the additional traffic of the TGV service, two new stations were built. Unusually, RFF took responsibility for building the stations, which will connect to the TER network and to Montpellier's tram network. These new stations, Montpellier Sud-de-France (referred to as Montpellier Odysséum during the planning phase) and Nîmes-Pont-du-Gard (originally planned to be named Nîmes Manduel-Redessan), were built as part of the overall programme and were completed in 2018 and 2019 respectively. The estimated construction cost of these stations was €280 million ($349.5 million) which was financed by the European Union and France providing a combined 52 per cent, along with a further 28 per cent from various regional and local authorities, as well as the final 20% by SNCF Réseau.

The main line is 60 km (37 mi) long, plus a 10 km (6.2 mi) connection to rail freight lines West of the Rhone river, and three more spurs connecting to existing railways at Jonquières, Lattes, and Manduel. The Nîmes-Montpellier bypass is to be equipped with the European Rail Traffic Management System (ERTMS) Level 2, the standard train signalling and traffic management system used throughout Europe, including GSM-R, the European standard for railway telecommunications. However, BAL will be used in the first instance. To provide power for the overhead lines, the construction of a new substation at La Castelle was necessary. Infrastructure maintenance activities are to be based at Nîmes, comprising the operational and administrative centres of Oc’Via Maintenance.
