= LGV Rhône-Alpes =

French high-speed railway

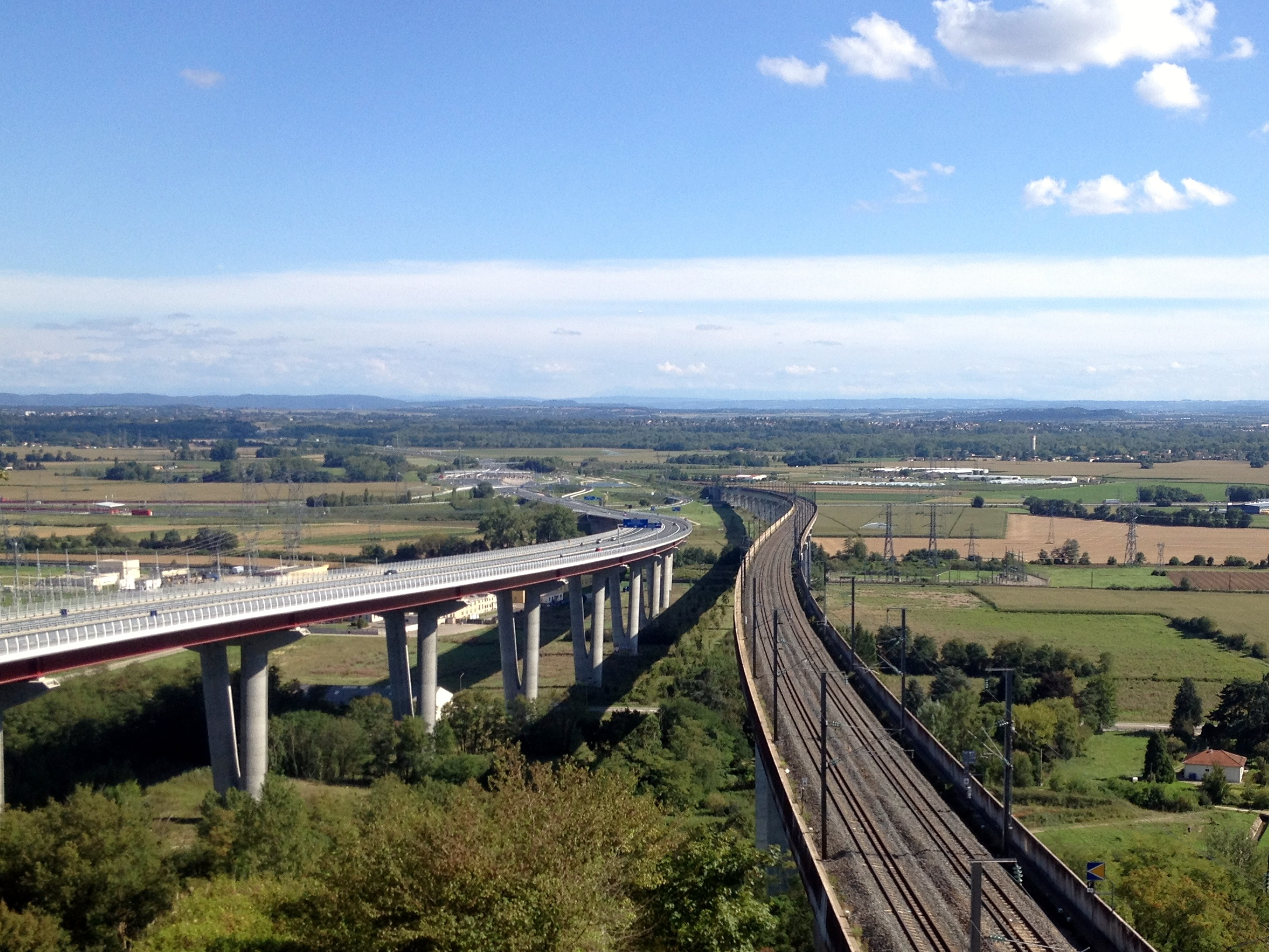
- The line running next to the A432 autoroute in Beynost

Overview
- Status: Operational
- Owner: SNCF Réseau
- Locale: Auvergne-Rhône-Alpes, France
- Termini: Sathonay-Camp; Valence TGV station

Service
- System: SNCF
- Operator(s): SNCF (1989–1997); RFF (1997–2014); SNCF (2015–present)

History
- Opened: 13 December 1992: 42 km between Montanay et Saint-Quentin-Fallavier; 3 July 1994: full line

Technical
- Line length: 115 km (71 mi)
- Num of tracks: Double track
- Track gauge: 1,435 mm (4 ft 8 1/2 in) standard gauge
- Electrification: 25 kV 50 Hz
- Operating speed: 300 km/h (186 mph)
- Signalling: TVM 430

The LGV Rhône-Alpes (French: Ligne à Grande Vitesse; English: high-speed line) is a 115 km (71 mi) French high-speed rail line situated in the Auvergne-Rhône-Alpes region which extends the LGV Sud-Est southwards. Opened to service in 1994, the line bypasses the built-up Lyon area towards the east; in addition it serves Lyon–Saint-Exupéry Airport. Beyond Valence TGV station the line is continued by the LGV Méditerranée. LGVs Rhône-Alpes, Sud-Est and Méditerranée, when completed, received their official nickname, the City To Coast (C2C) Highway ("Ville à la Mer").

The line was constructed in two sections, north and south. The first section was opened in time for the 1992 Winter Olympics in Albertville.

== Route ==
The line crosses four departments from north to south: Ain, Rhône, Isère and Drôme.

The route of the new line represents a total length of 115 km (71 mi); 42 km (26 mi) from Montanay to Saint-Quentin-Fallavier, and 73 km (45 mi) from Saint-Quentin-Fallavier to Valence. The line is connected to the regular network by links at Saint-Quentin-Fallavier, enabling links to Savoie, Isère and Italy via Chambéry and Modane.

== Line specifics ==
The line has a surface area of 12.18 km^{2} (4.70 sq mi) (in comparison Lyon-Saint-Exupéry Airport occupies the same area).

Like the LGV Sud-Est, the line was designed for a nominal speed of 300 km/h (186 mph), with a minimum curve radius of 4,000 m (13,000 ft), and a space between track centres of 4.2 m (14 ft). The second section is designed for 320 km/h (199 mph).

The line includes 10 large viaducts (total length 4.3 km (2.7 mi)), and 4 tunnels (total length 5.3 km (3.3 mi)).

A command post named CCT (Commande centralisée des trains - Central Train Command) enables the continual monitoring of trains running on the entire line and to remotely control security installations. It is situated in Lyon, in an SNCF building near the gare de Perrache.

== Stations ==
The line comprises one new station: Gare de Lyon Saint-Exupéry, situated in the commune of Colombier-Saugnieu. This station, with its striking architecture, is the work of the Spanish architect Santiago Calatrava. It serves the Lyon–Saint-Exupéry Airport.

== History ==
- 28 October 1989: declaration of public utility
- 13 December 1992: service begins on 42 km first section between Montanay and Saint-Quentin-Fallavier
- 3 July 1994: service begins on 73 km second section between Saint-Quentin-Fallavier and Saint-Marcel-lès-Valence
- 3 July 1994: inauguration of Gare de Lyon-Saint-Exupéry TGV
- 7 June 2001: inauguration of LGV Méditerranée extending this line southwards

== See also ==
- High-speed rail in France
