= LGV Montpellier–Perpignan =

Future French high-speed railway

Montpellier to Perpignan high-speed line
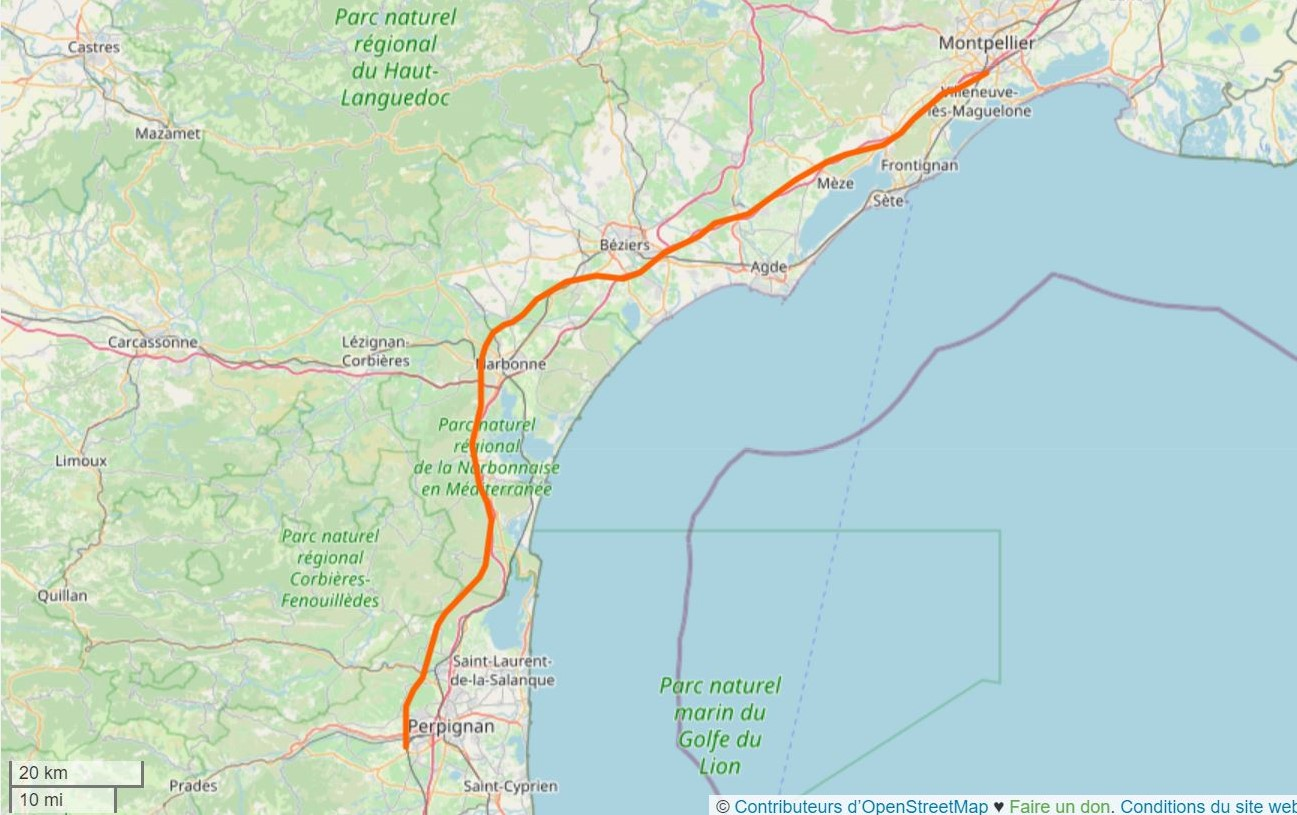
- Route of the LGV Montpellier-Perpignan

Overview
- Native name: Ligne nouvelle de Montpellier à Perpignan
- Status: Planned
- Owner: SNCF Réseau
- Locale: France
- Termini: Montpellier; Perpignan
- Stations: Montpellier, Béziers, Narbonne, Perpignan

Service
- Type: High-speed railway

History
- Planned opening: 2034
- Completed: 2044

Technical
- Line length: 150 km (93 mi)
- Number of tracks: 2
- Character: Mixed (passengers and freight)
- Track gauge: 1,435 mm (4 ft 8 1/2 in)
- Electrification: 25 kV AC, 50 Hz
- Operating speed: 350 km/h (220 mph)
- Signalling: ETCS Level 2, KVB

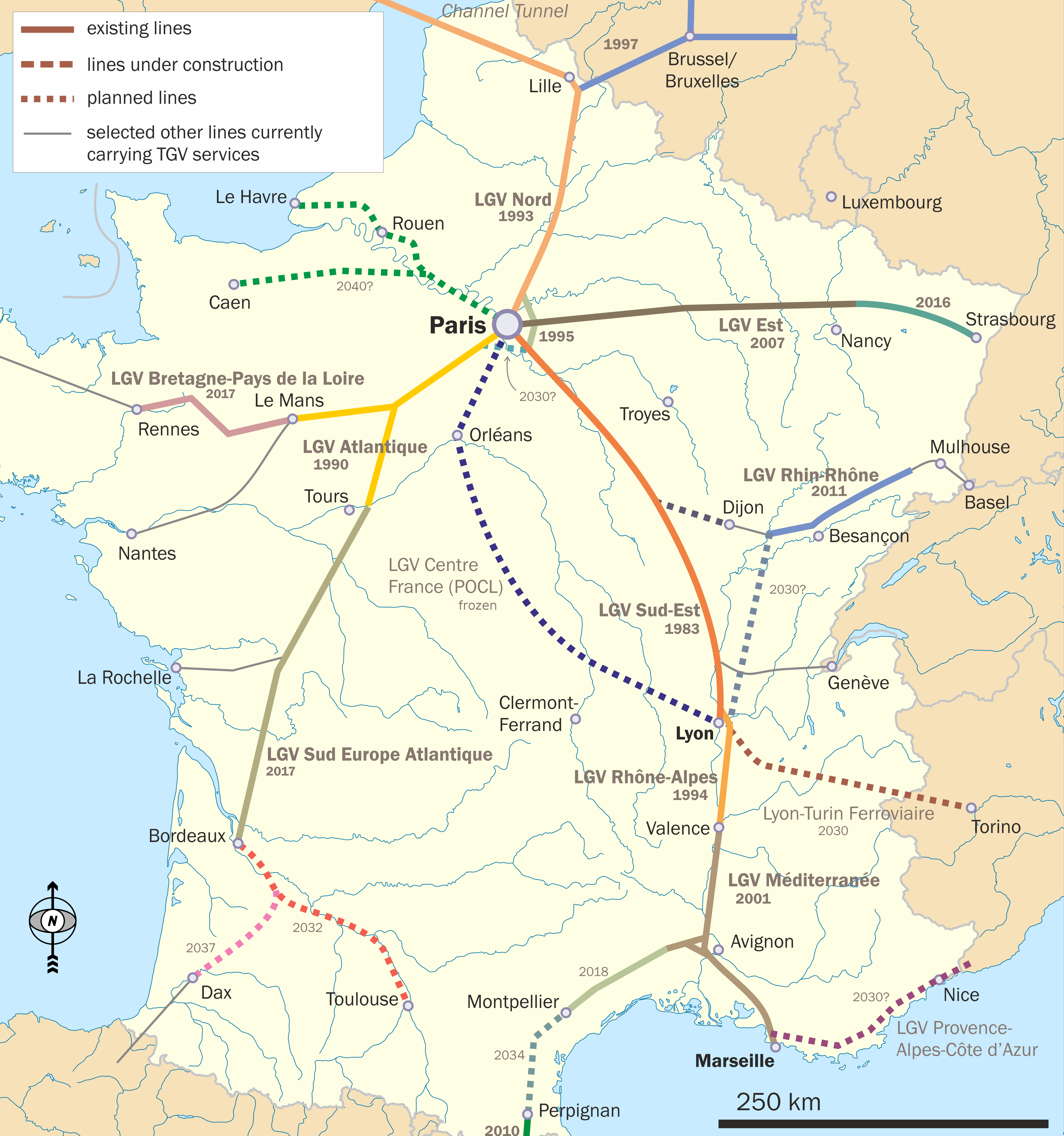
French TGV network, with the planned high-speed line from Montpellier to Perpignan in the south

The LGV Montpellier–Perpignan (or Ligne nouvelle Montpellier - Perpignan) is a planned high-speed rail line between the French cities of Montpellier and Perpignan. It represents the missing link in a larger project to connect the Spanish rail network to the existing LGV Méditerranée. The new line will connect the Contournement Nîmes – Montpellier to the 45 km LGV Perpignan–Figueres, which crosses the French-Spanish border at Le Perthus to reach Barcelona.

The project includes two new stations in Béziers and Narbonne. The sections Montpellier–Béziers and Rivesaltes–Toulouges will be for mixed traffic (freight and passenger), with Béziers–Toulouges being for passenger traffic only.

The project aims to reduce travel times between Paris and Barcelona by 2040. The journey would emit significantly less greenhouse gases compared to air travel and would be competitive in terms of travel time.

== Purpose and characteristics ==
In the 1980s, the creation of a high-speed line from the Rhône Valley to the Spanish border was considered. This project was abandoned in 1995, at the same time as the LGV Méditerranée was shortened by 60 km, being built only to Nîmes instead of Montpellier. Preliminary studies were halted due to traffic estimates that were too low to make the line profitable.

The saturation of the historic line led in 2001 to studies for the construction of a mixed passenger/freight line. The purpose of such a line is twofold:

- To provide high-speed service to the Languedoc-Roussillon region and constitute a link in a European high-speed axis between Spain (notably Madrid and Barcelona) and Paris and eastern France, as well as Italy and Switzerland
- To relieve the historic line of part of its traffic. Additional train paths would thus be freed up to allow for more regional trains (TER) and freight trains, with the possibility of shifting part of the road traffic to rail

A mixed-use line is more expensive to build because several requirements must be reconciled:

- Curves with a high radius: the circulation of slow trains (freight) does not allow for maximum cant on the track for TGVs traveling at more than 300 km/h; this must be compensated for by curves with a larger radius (above 6,000 meters, compared to 4,000 m for a standard high-speed line)
- Gentle slopes to allow for the circulation of heavy freight trains (approximately 1% maximum, compared to 3% to 3.5% for high-speed lines)
- A track capable of supporting higher axle loads (22 t), as a freight train is 30% heavier than a TGV (17 t) designed for high speed
- A wider track spacing (distance between the two tracks) to allow for safe crossings between a freight train and a TGV

SNCF Réseau also introduced the concept of a "rail highway," a line meeting the above characteristics and allowing for the circulation of convoys with a larger loading gauge than classic trains. The height of the overhead line, for example, would be increased from 5.08 m to 5.60 m above the tracks, in order to transport trucks (tractor + trailer) on non-lowered wagons.

== Technical specifications ==
The line will have the following technical characteristics:

- Total length: 150 km
- Operational speed: 320 km/h
- Design speed: 350 km/h
- Track gauge: Standard
- Electrification: 25,000 volts, 50 Hz
- Maximum gradient: 10‰ (per mille)
- Number of tracks: 2
- Signaling: ETCS level 2, KVB (Contrôle de vitesse par balises)
- Owner: SNCF Réseau
- Traffic: TGV (high-speed passenger), Freight

== Route ==
Shortly after Montpellier-Sud de France station, trains will meet the LGV Montpellier–Perpignan near Maurin.

A parkway station serving Béziers near the A9 and A75 junction is planned. There will also be a classic line allowing trains to call at Béziers station, from which trains can then continue to destinations such as Narbonne and Carcassonne before the Béziers-Perpignan section is complete. Through trains in the direction of Perpignan will need to use the parkway station, as there is no link on the other side of Béziers.

The urban center of Narbonne will be bypassed, but a station will be constructed to the west of the urban center. This station will be built over the classic line, allowing platform transfers to the line to Carcassonne, as is the case at Valence TGV station. There will also be a triangle junction to the north of this station allowing the line to link with the line to Carcassonne without passing through the urban center.

The planned line will offer bypasses of all the cities, with link railways to enable connections with existing stations at various points. Passive provision has been made for a connection with the existing LGV Perpignan-Figueres line near Toulouges.

== History ==
The Madrid Agreement of 10 October 1995 provided for the construction of a high-speed rail link between France and Spain with competitive bidding for a design, construction, and operation concession. Preliminary studies were validated. In 2000, the LGV Languedoc Roussillon, between Montpellier and Perpignan, was declared a project of general interest (PIG), and on 16 May 2005, the mixed passenger and freight line project for the Nîmes and Montpellier bypass was declared of public utility by decree. However, nothing was decided for the Montpellier - Perpignan section.

In 2006, the Ministry of Transport asked RFF (Réseau Ferré de France) to undertake studies for the new Montpellier-Perpignan line (LNMP). In September 2008, it was decided to organize a public debate for the new Montpellier - Perpignan line, which took place from 3 March to 3 July 2009. On 26 November 2009, following the public debate, it was decided to continue studies for a mixed freight/high-speed line.

On 14 November 2011, the Minister for Ecology, Sustainable Development, Transport, and Housing validated the first stage of the studies, defining a 1,000-meter-wide corridor for the line. At the end of 2012, actor Pierre Richard and judoka Automne Pavia participated in a national advertising campaign funded by the Aude departmental council and Grand Narbonne for the creation of a TGV station in Narbonne.

In January 2016, Secretary of State for Transport Alain Vidalies indicated that he wanted to approve the Montpellier-Perpignan route. For Carole Delga, president of the Languedoc-Roussillon-Midi-Pyrénées Region, "the minister has committed to approving the proposed route resulting from the consultation in the coming days."

On 3 February 2016, Secretary of State for Transport Alain Vidalies confirmed the choice of route and station locations for the new Montpellier-Perpignan line (LNMP). The route was then specified, with a width of 100 to 200 meters. Two new stations were planned, one in Béziers and the other in Narbonne.

In September 2016, a Senate report came out against the creation of new lines in the Occitanie region and recommended a fifteen-year freeze on funding, preferring to prioritize the financing of maintenance for classic lines in other regions. However, the project was actively supported by many elected officials in the Occitanie region, particularly the deputy of Hérault Philippe Huppé and the mayor of Montpellier Philippe Saurel.

In autumn 2018, timescales were announced, namely 10 years to construct the Montpellier-Béziers section and another 10 years to construct the Béziers-Perpignan section.

On 8 July 2020, Louis Aliot asked Prime Minister Jean Castex to firmly commit to accelerating the Montpellier-Perpignan high-speed line and to opening up Perpignan and its department. The Prime Minister replied: "I will put all my energy into making it advance at a speed superior to that which it has had until now."

At the end of April 2021, Prime Minister Jean Castex defended an "acceleration of the project" after the announcement of state funding for the Bordeaux-Toulouse high-speed line.

On 16 February 2023, phase 1 of the project, creating the mixed line from Montpellier to Béziers, was declared of public utility.

Permission to start the preliminary work on the first section was expected to be given by 27 July 2023.

== Progress ==
A memorandum of understanding for the financing of the line was signed on 22 January 2022, under which the Occitanie region and ten smaller-scale local authorities will pay 40% of the €2 billion cost of the first phase. The national government contributes another 40% and the European Commission 20%. After this agreement, a public inquiry process was about to start. A special purpose body to oversee delivery, financing and project management was formed in March 2022.

Construction on the first section, which runs for 52.3 km from Montpellier to Béziers, is expected to begin in 2029 and be operational in 2034. The construction of the second section would follow around 2039-2040 and be completed by 2044. For the second section, a new public consultation is expected to begin in the fall of 2025. The second section covers the remainder of the route and is 97.7 km long.

On 23 October 2025, the board of directors of the Montpellier-Perpignan High-Speed Line company (SLNMP) confirmed the project timeline and announced that a new financing agreement of €68.6 million would be signed in 2026 to fund studies in preparation for the tender launch for phase 1, scheduled for autumn 2026. Partner communities renewed their financial commitment of €66.7 million until 2028. The company also joined Occitanie Europe to strengthen cooperation with the European Union, building on the EU's €38 million contribution to the project over the previous ten years.

The total cost of the project is estimated at 6 billion euros.

== See also ==
- LGV Méditerranée
