= Montpellier Sud de France station =

Railway station in Southern France

Montpellier Sud de France
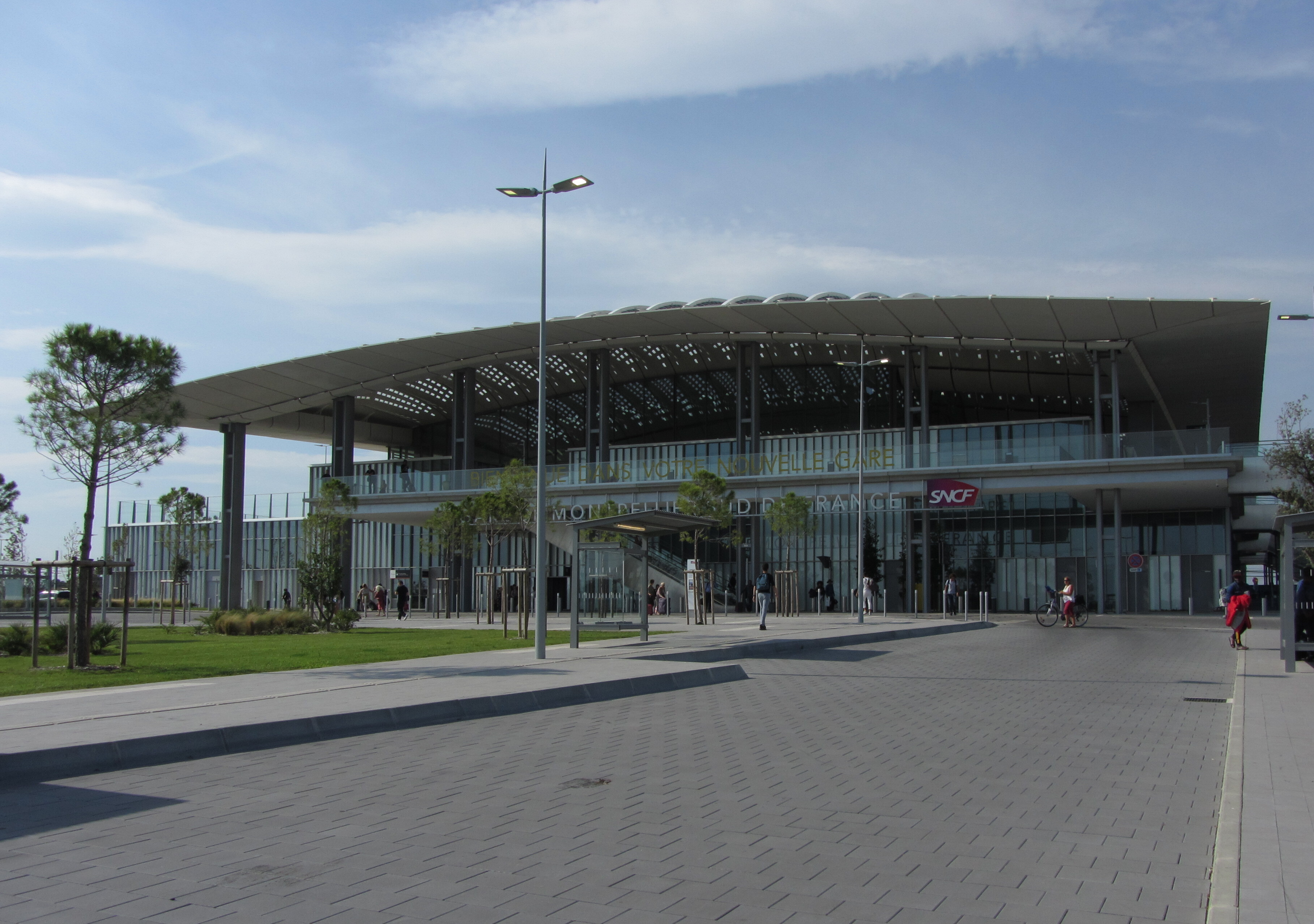
- Façade of Montpellier Sud de France station

General information
- Location: 1521 Rue de la Fontaine de la Banquière; 34000 Montpellier; Hérault; France
- Coordinates: 43°35′42″N 3°55′31″E
- Owner: SNCF Réseau
- Operator: SNCF
- Line: Contournement Nîmes – Montpellier
- Platforms: 4
- Tracks: 6

Other information
- Station code: 87688887

History
- Opened: 7 July 2018

Passengers
- 2024: 2,514,013

Services
Preceding station	SNCF	Following station
Nîmes-Pont-du-Gard towards Paris-Lyon	TGV inOui	Sète towards Perpignan
Preceding station	Ouigo	Following station
Nîmes-Pont-du-Gard towards Tourcoing	Grande Vitesse	Terminus
Location

Montpellier Sud de France station (French: Gare de Montpellier Sud de France) is a railway station on the outskirts of Montpellier, France which offers TGV services.

Montpellier Sud de France was built for and opened in 2018 a few months after the Nîmes – Montpellier Bypass, which extends from the end of the LGV Méditerranée near Nîmes, Gard to just beyond Montpellier, Hérault.

== Station ==
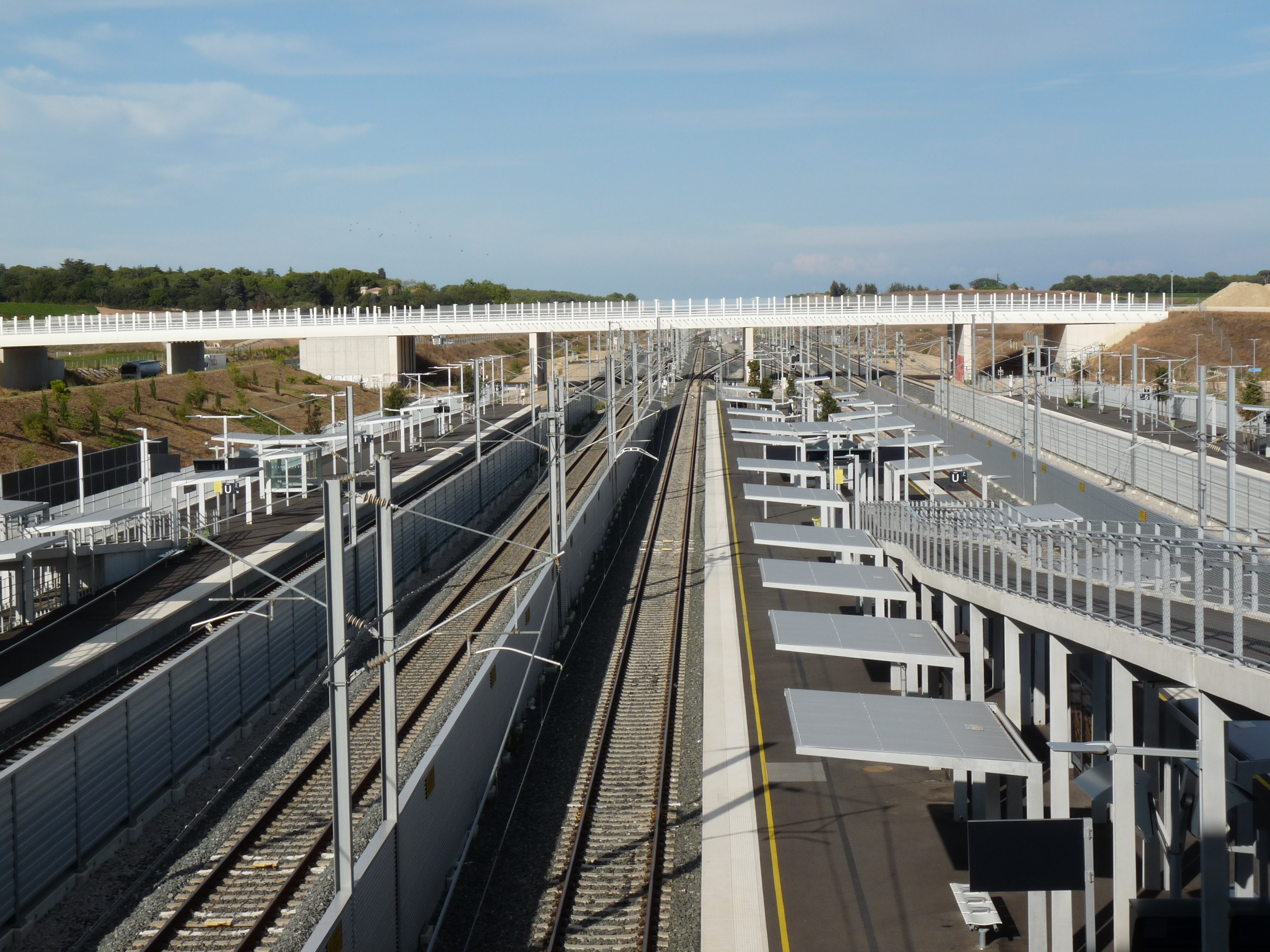
Platforms

Montpellier Sud de France has four platforms and six tracks. The 1st, 3rd, 4th and 6th tracks allow train access to the platforms and the 2nd and 5th tracks are used by passing traffic (the Contournement Nîmes – Montpellier is also used by freight traffic).

Autoroute 709 (a branch of the A9) provides road access to the station.

The station is situated at the edge of Montpellier near the Château de la Mogère.

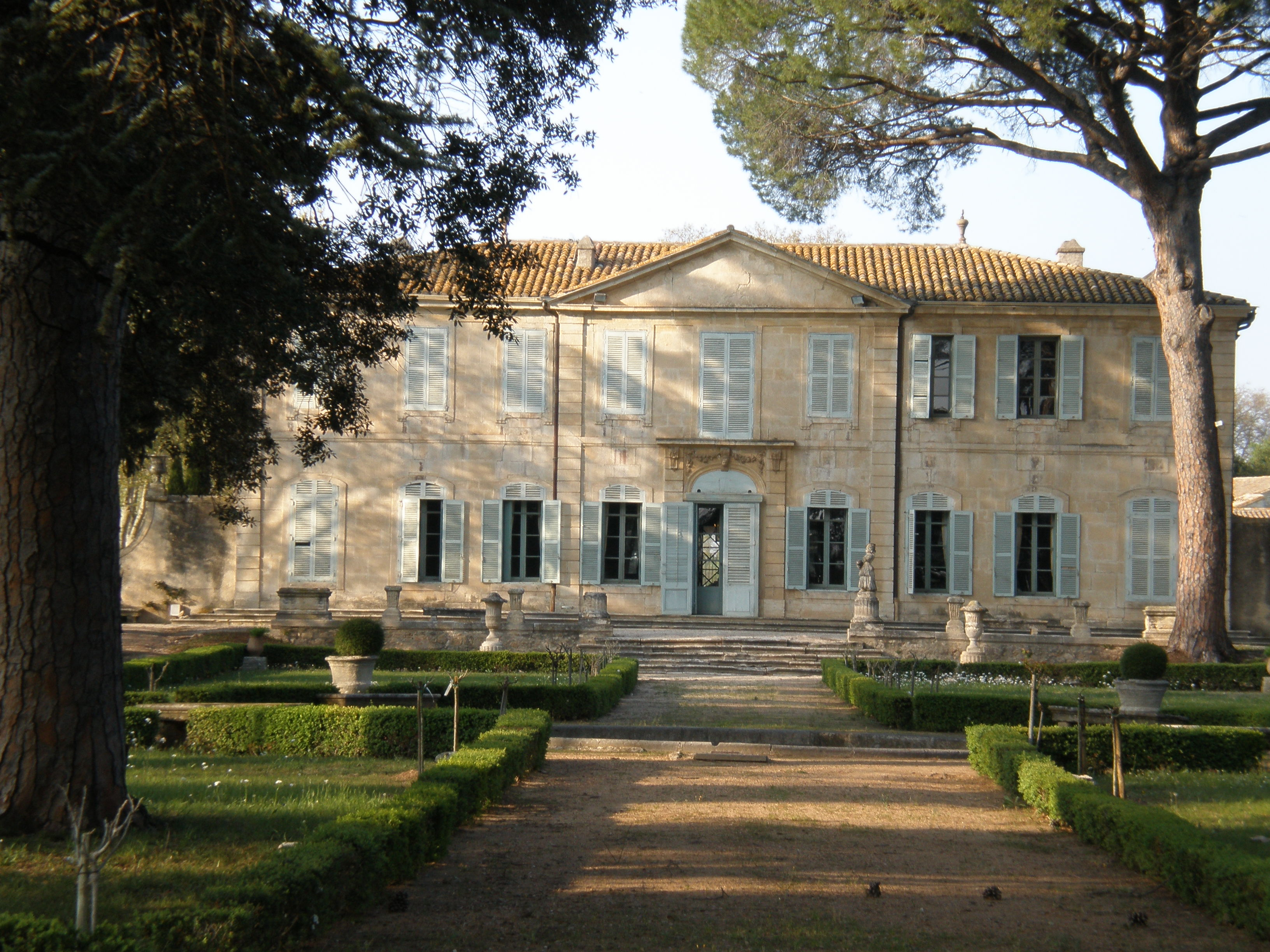
Château de la Mogère

== Train services ==
Termini of TGV services to and from the station include Paris Gare de Lyon, Brussels-South, Lyon-Part-Dieu, Luxembourg, Toulouse-Matabiau, Nantes, Lille (both Europe and Flandres), Perpignan, and Béziers.

The fastest travel time between Paris and Montpellier Sud de France is 3 h 4 m.

== Local services ==
Gare Sud de France is the southeastern terminus of Line 1 of the Montpellier tramway.

Bus services are provided to the Place de France, Montpellier.
