= British Rail Class 374 =

Eurostar high speed train

British Rail Class 374 Eurostar e320
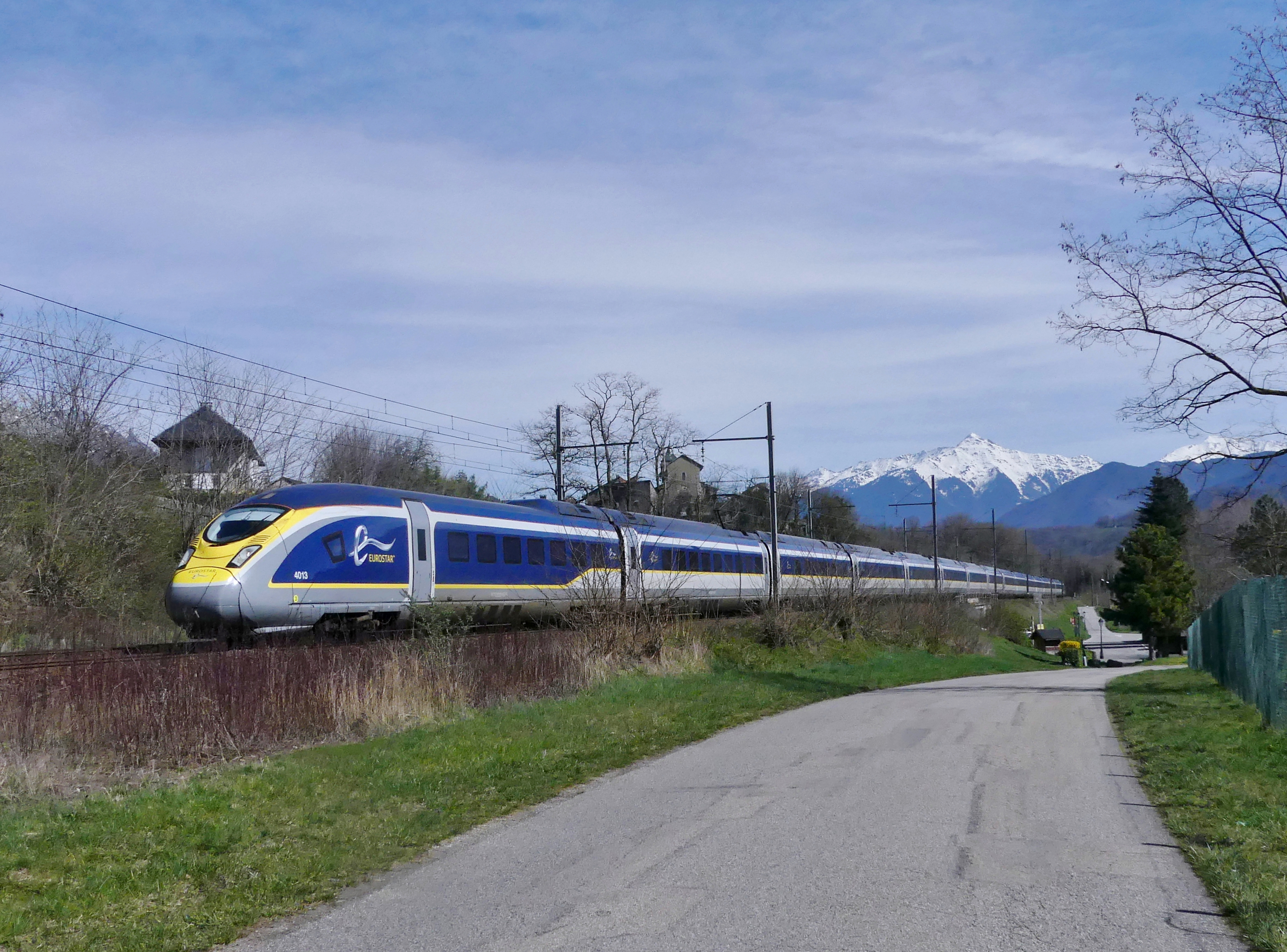
- A Eurostar Class 374 in the Savoie Alps

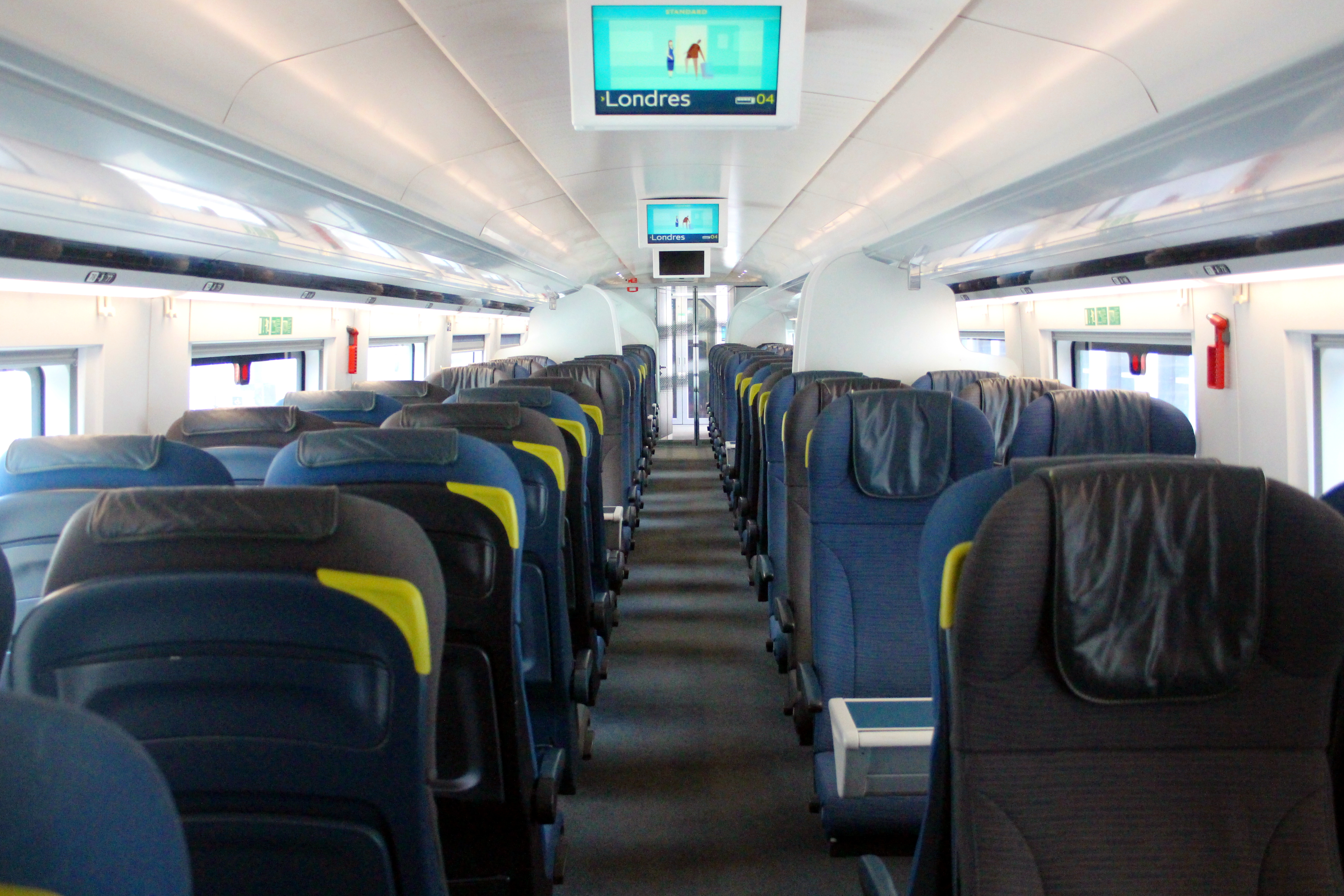
- Standard class interior
- In service: 20 November 2015 – present
- Manufacturer: Siemens Mobility
- Built at: Krefeld, Germany
- Family name: Velaro D
- Replaced: Class 373
- Constructed: 2011–2018
- Number built: 17 units
- Formation: 16 cars per unit
- Capacity: 902 seats
- Operator: Eurostar
- Depots: Temple Mills (UK); Technicentre du Landy (France)

Specifications
- Car body construction: Aluminium
- Train length: 400 m (1,300 ft)
- Car length: Driving vehs.: 25.7 m (84 ft 4 in); Intermediate vehs: 24.2 m (79 ft 5 in)
- Doors: Single-Leaf Plug
- Maximum speed: 320 km/h (200 mph)
- Traction system: Siemens IGBT-VVVF
- Traction motors: 32 × Siemens 500 kW (670 hp) 3-phase AC induction motor
- Power output: 16 MW (21,000 hp)
- Electric systems: Overhead line: 25 kV 50 Hz AC; 3,000 V DC; 1,500 V DC
- Current collection: Pantograph
- UIC classification: Bo′Bo′+2′2′+Bo′Bo′+2′2′+2′2′+Bo′Bo′+2′2′+Bo′Bo′+Bo′Bo′+2′2′+Bo′Bo′+2′2′+2′2′+Bo′Bo′+2′2′+Bo′Bo′
- Safety systems: ETCS; KVB; TVM; RPS; TBL; Memor; ATB
- Coupling system: Scharfenberg (for rescue only)
- Multiple working: Not fitted
- Track gauge: 1,435 mm (4 ft 8 1/2 in) standard gauge

The British Rail Class 374, also referred to as the Eurostar e320, is a type of electric multiple unit passenger train used on Eurostar services through the Channel Tunnel to serve destinations beyond the core routes to Paris and Brussels. Passenger services began in November 2015. The trains, owned by Eurostar International Limited, are sixteen-coach versions of the Siemens Velaro. Each train is 400 m (1,300 ft) long. The trains are compliant with the Technical Specifications for Interoperability (TSI).

Eurostar International's older fleet of Class 373 "Eurostar e300" trains, introduced in 1994 when the Channel Tunnel opened, could not be used on the 15 kV AC overhead line (OHLE) electrification system used in Germany, and most of the older trains could not be used on the 1.5 kV DC OHLE used in the Netherlands, and the trains did not have sufficient space on board to install ERTMS signalling, which meant that Eurostar could not run services to these countries. The Class 374 was designed and built to overcome these problems and enable Eurostar to run services to these locations. However, on the trains finally ordered, the option of 15 kV AC supply was not included.

When the Class 374 trains are used in Britain, they can only run on High Speed 1, which has been designed to accommodate larger trains from mainland Europe, having a larger loading gauge compared to the domestic British rail network.

The original order for ten sets was increased to seventeen sets in November 2014. As of June 2025, Eurostar operates their Channel Tunnel services with these 17 Class 374 trains and eight refurbished Class 373 trains.

== Development ==
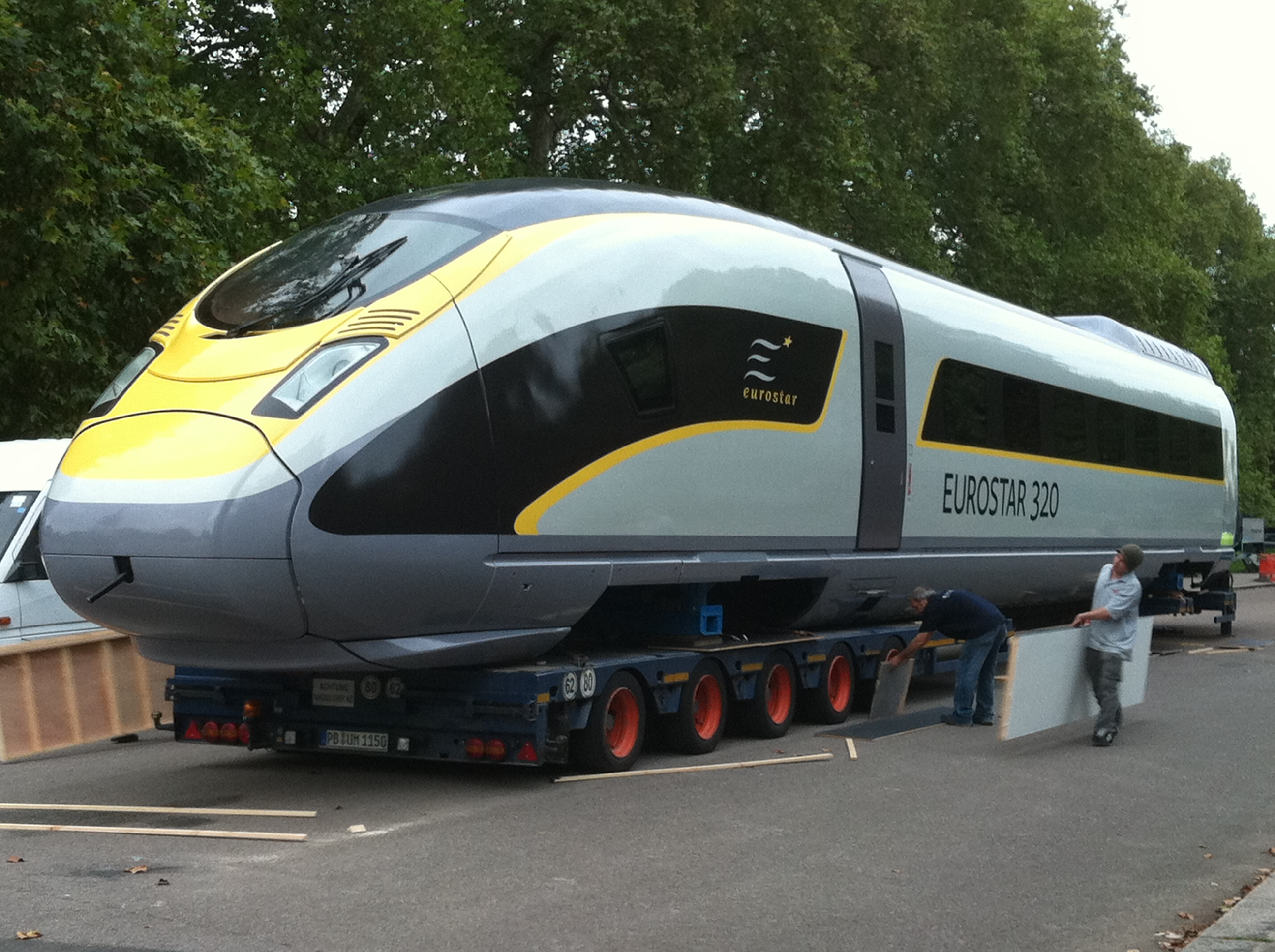
Mock up on display in Kensington Gardens in London in 2010

Siemens Velaro high speed EMUs are derived from the ICE 3 first used by Deutsche Bahn (DB) in 2000. Variants include DB Class 407, intended for international services including through the Channel Tunnel.

In 2009, Eurostar announced a £700 million project to update its fleet, with approximately £550 million for new trains able to operate away from the core London-Paris/Brussels network. In October 2010, Eurostar announced that Siemens had been selected, with the Velaro platform to be used. The Velaro e320, named because of plans to operate at 320 km/h (200 mph), would be 16 cars long, to meet the Channel Tunnel safety specifications but would have distributed traction with the traction equipment along the length of the train, not concentrated in power cars at each end.

=== Alstom litigation ===
The nomination of Siemens saw it break into the French high-speed market, as all French and French subsidiary high-speed operators up to that point used TGV derivatives produced by Alstom. Alstom attempted legal action to prevent the contract, claiming that the Siemens sets would breach Channel Tunnel safety rules, but their claim was rejected by the High Court. Alstom said that it would "pursue alternative legal options to uphold its position", and on 4 November 2010 it lodged a complaint with the European Commission over the tendering process, who then asked the British government for "clarification". Alstom then announced it had started legal action against Eurostar in the High Court in London. In July 2011, the High Court rejected Alstom's claim that the tender process was flawed and the resulting contract "ineffective" under the Utilities Contracts Regulations, and in April 2012 Alstom said it would call off pending court actions against Eurostar.

== Construction and delivery ==
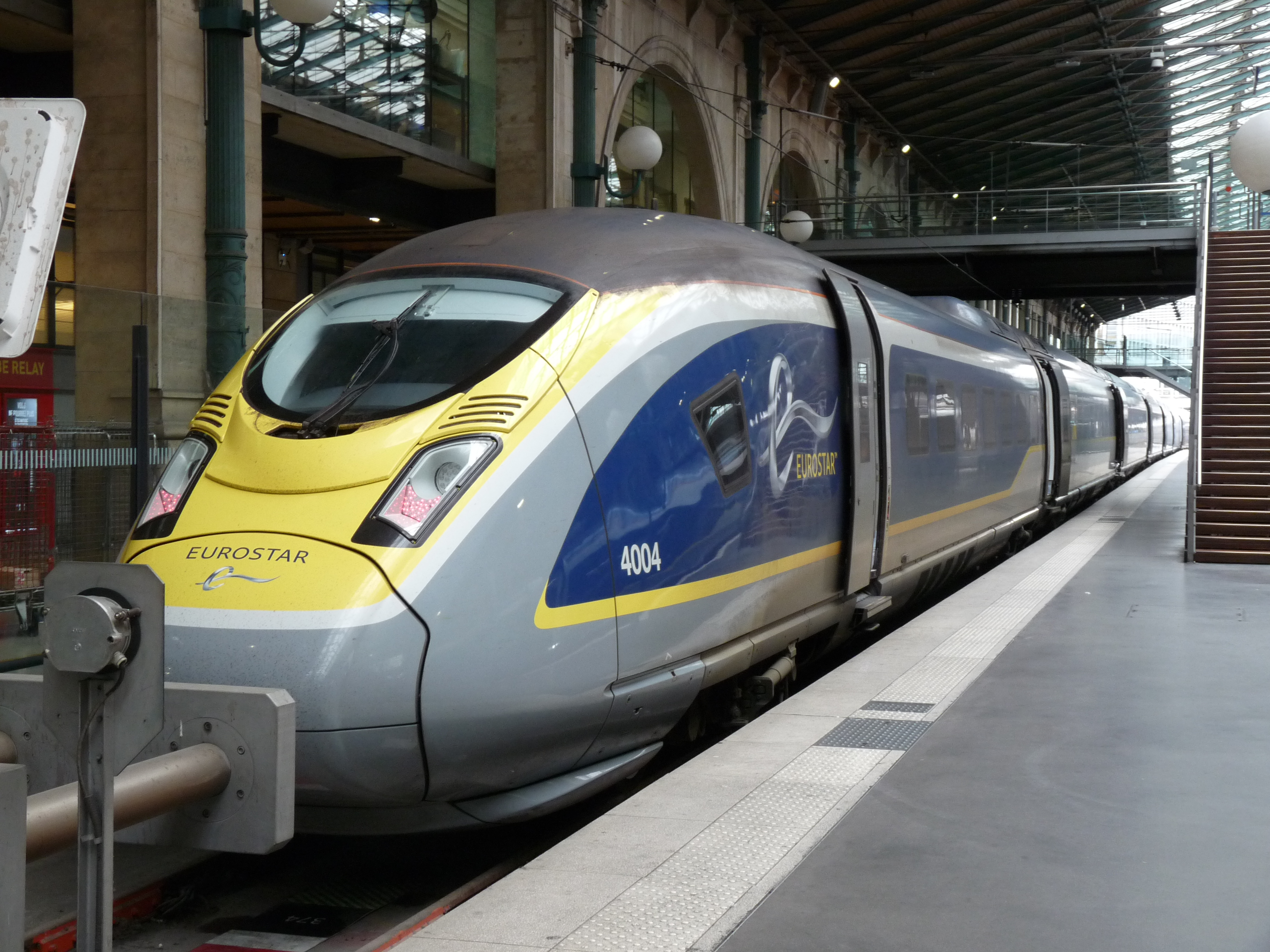
Eurostar e320 at Gare du Nord in Paris

The trains were constructed at the Siemens plant at Krefeld in Germany, with the first rolled out for testing at the Wildenrath test circuit in early 2013 as Class 374, with the first unit bearing this UIC identification mark. The intention was for the first unit to enter service in 2014, but the approval was delayed. As a consequence, Eurostar did receive its first unit in 2014 for presentation but operation could only start a year later.

At the presentation of the first train in London in November 2014, Eurostar announced that they had ordered seven additional train sets, and that the first e320 service would be at the end of 2015. By November 2014 nine of the ten original order trains had been built, and all ten were scheduled to be delivered by April 2016. The seven trains in the second order were all operational by March 2018.

=== Testing ===
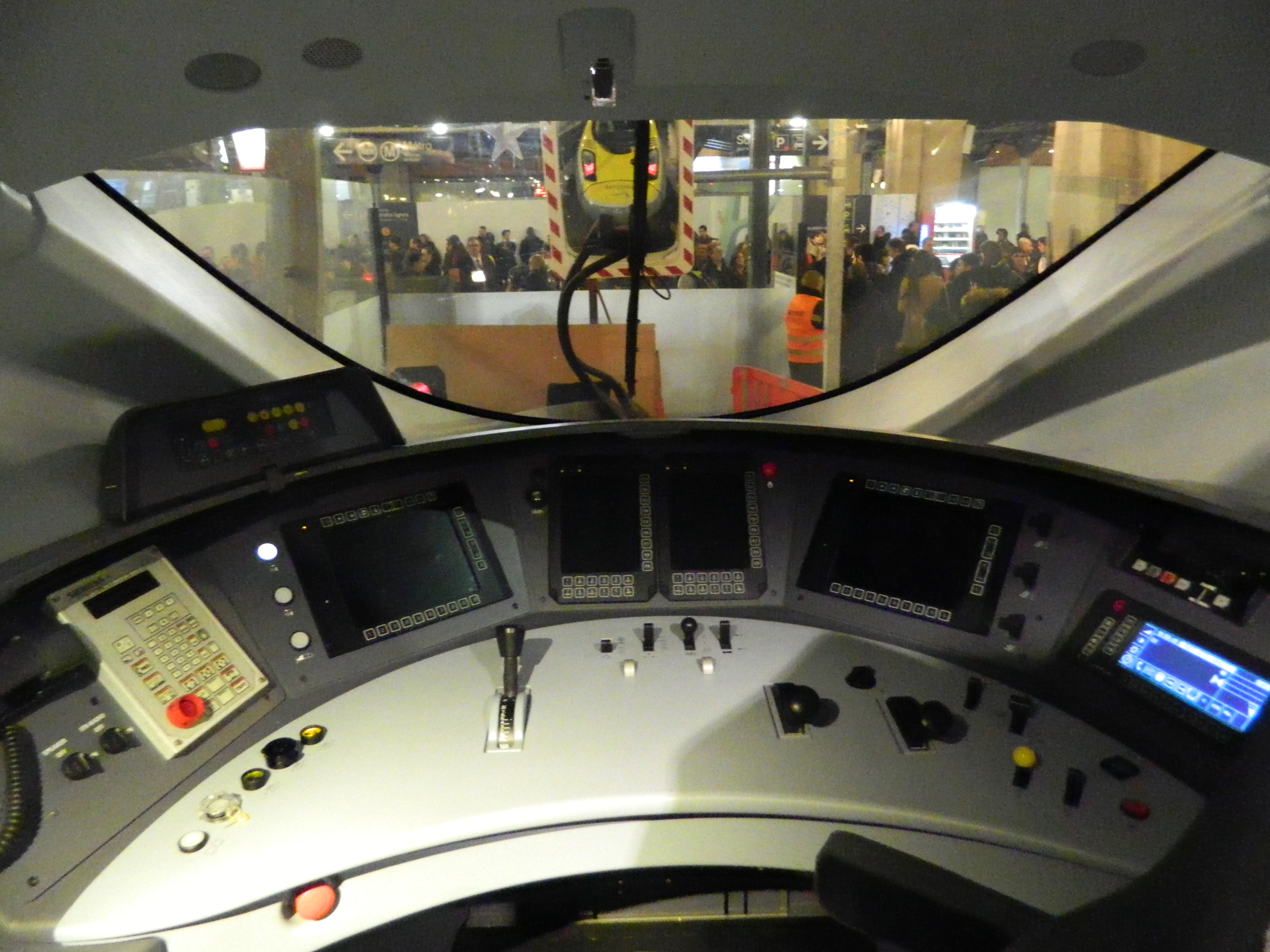
The cab of a Class 374 at Paris Gare du Nord

By April 2013, testing had started at Siemens Mobility's Wegberg-Wildenrath Test and Validation Centre.

On 27 January 2014, set 4007+4008 was hauled across Belgium by B-Logistiks' TRAXX E 186 199, and on the night of 29/30 January 2014 was delivered to Temple Mills Depot.

Following tests, the French Railway Safety Board (EPSF) granted an authorisation to run the train in France on 16 October 2015; the approval for operating through the Channel Tunnel was granted on 19 November by the Intergovernmental Commission (IGC). At the beginning of January 2016 the Belgian authority SSICF authorised the operation in its country.

== Operations ==
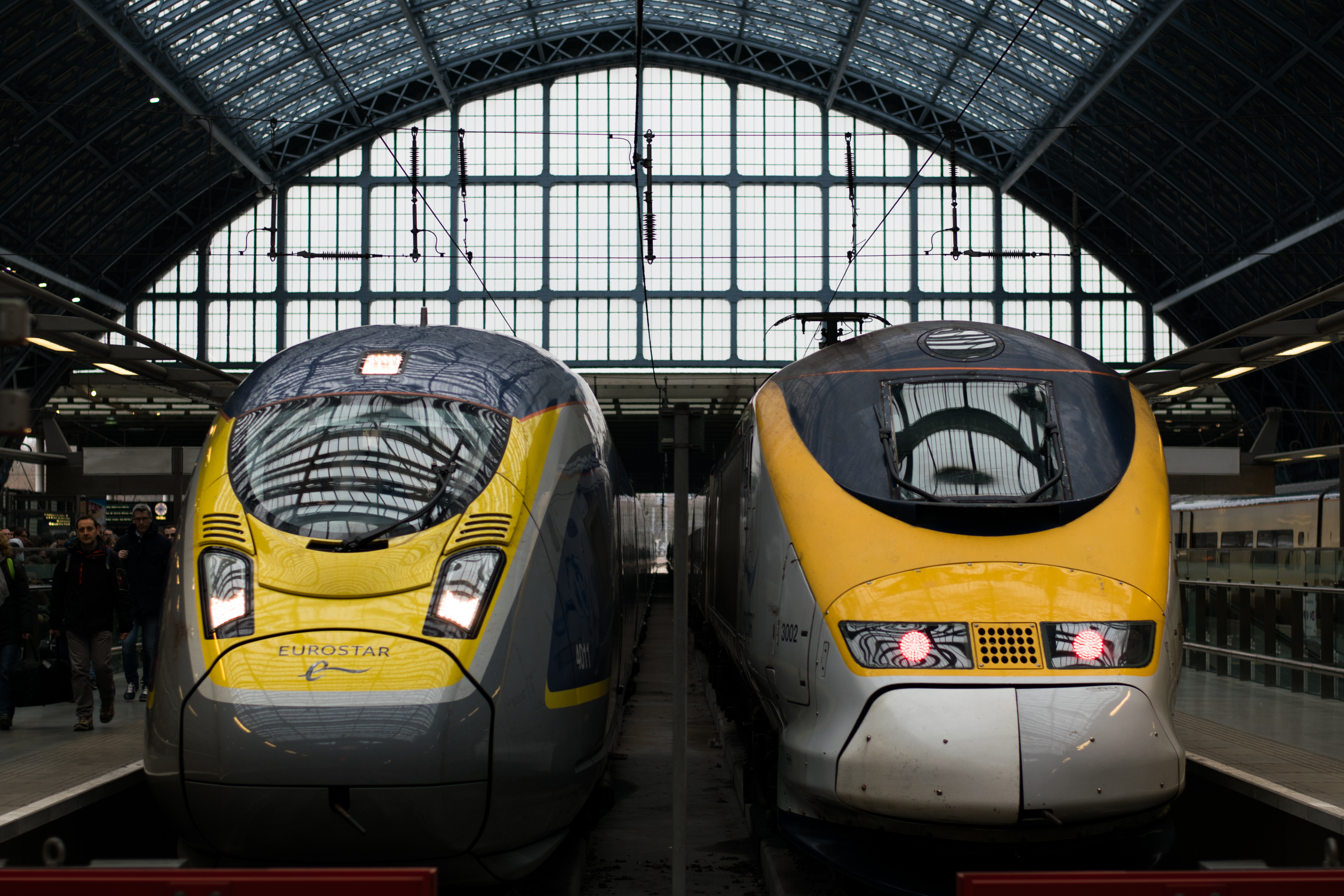
Class 374 alongside a Class 373 at London St Pancras

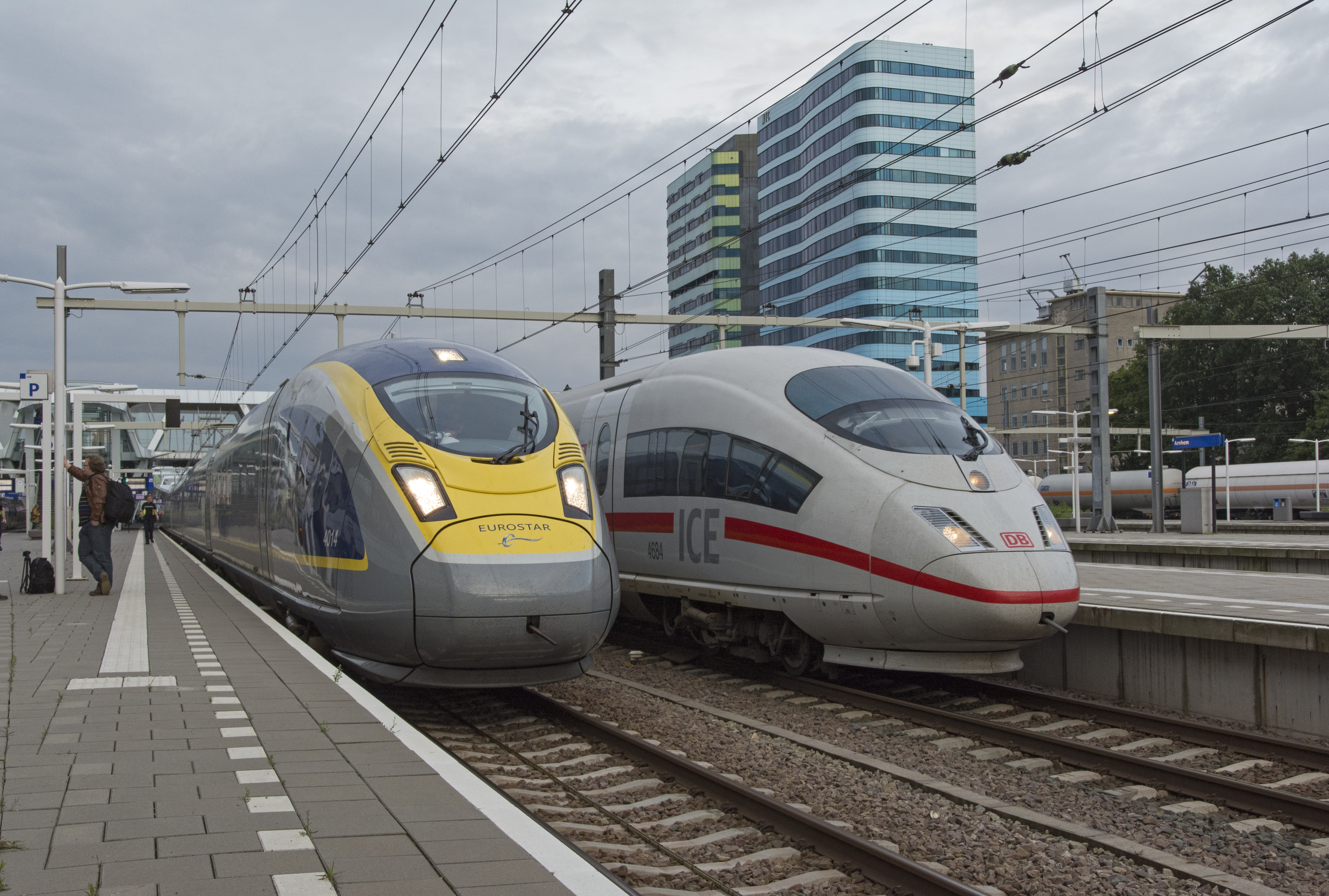
A Class 374 at Arnhem Centraal during a test run; alongside is a Deutsche Bahn ICE 3M EMU

Eurostar have used the trains to expand its core operation between London St Pancras International, Paris Gare du Nord and Brussels Midi/Zuid. To meet the prospect of increased competition through the Channel Tunnel (primarily from DB), it intends to use them to expand its network to Amsterdam, Frankfurt and Cologne, and more destinations in France. The first Class 374 set entered service in November 2015, ahead of the full launch of the new type in December 2015, utilising the type on a small number of services for in-service testing. In September 2013, Eurostar announced that its new service between London and Amsterdam, intended to begin operation in December 2016, would be operated by the trains. In April 2018 the scheduled service to Amsterdam started with two e320 trains per day. Due to remodelling of Amsterdam Central the direct reservice was paused from summer 2024 to February 2025, and thereafter its frequency and passenger capacity increased. Following Eurostar's merger with Thalys, the trains have also been used for routes in Mainland Europe, as a replacement for the ageing PBKAs.

In early 2018, the tracks and international platforms at Ashford International underwent a £10-million refurbishment to allow compatibility with Eurostar's e320 trains from 1 April 2018. On 3 April 2018, the Secretary of State for Transport Chris Grayling met the first e320 that called at the station after the works have been called "completed" by the local authority. Problems with "power spikes" which damaged equipment of the new trains, however, initially prevented Class 374 trains from calling at Ashford, with the problem resolved in December 2019.

== Fleet details ==
| Class | Units | Operator | No. built | Year built | Cars per set | Services operated |
|---|---|---|---|---|---|---|
| 374 | 4001–4020 (Note: 93 70 3740 021–8 GB-EIL, 93 70 3740 022–6 GB-EIL, 93 70 3740 023–4 GB-EIL, 93 70 3740 024–2 GB-EIL,93 70 3740 025–9 GB-EIL, 93 70 3740 026–7 GB-EIL, 93 70 3740 027–5 GB-EIL, 93 70 3740 028–3 GB-EIL plus 93 70 3740 018–4 GB-EIL, 93 70 3740 017–6 GB-EIL, 93 70 3740 016–8 GB-EIL, 93 70 3740 015–0 GB-EIL, 93 70 3740 014–3 GB-EIL, 93 70 3740 013–5 GB-EIL, 93 70 3740 012–7 GB-EIL, 93 70 3740 011–9 GB-EIL.) | Eurostar | 10 (20 half-sets) | 2011–2013 | 16 | London-Paris/Brussels/Amsterdam |
| 374 | 4021–4034 | Eurostar | 7 (14 half-sets) | 2016–2018 | 16 | London-Paris/Brussels/Amsterdam |

Each set is formed of 16 coaches:

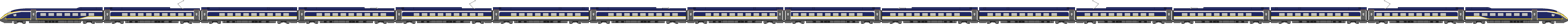
Illustration of the side profile of an e320 unit in current Eurostar livery
