= British Rail Class 373 =

Electric multiple unit that operates Eurostar's high-speed rail service

British Rail Class 373; Eurostar e300; TGV TMST
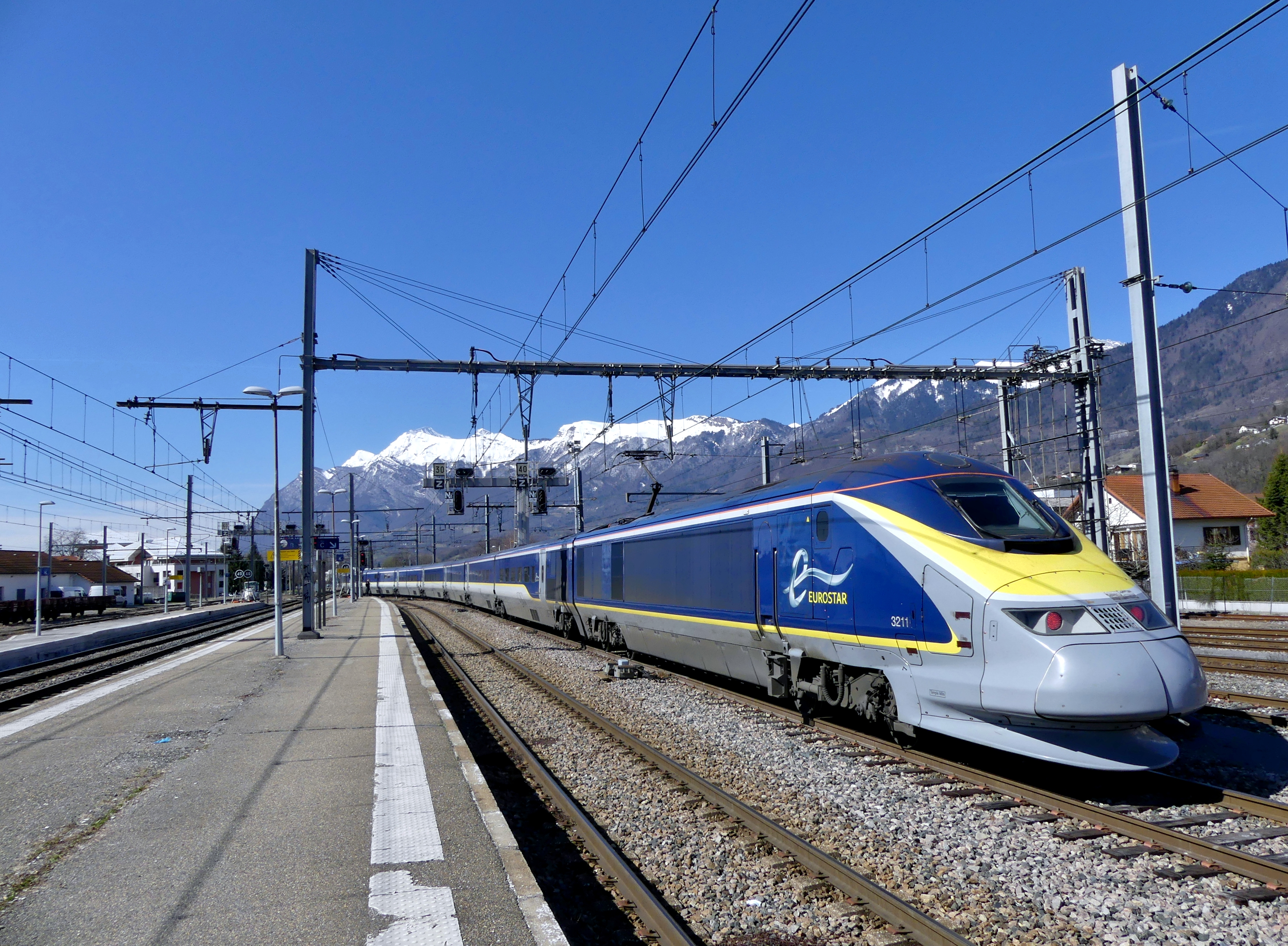
- A refurbished Class 373 at Gare d'Albertville in 2018

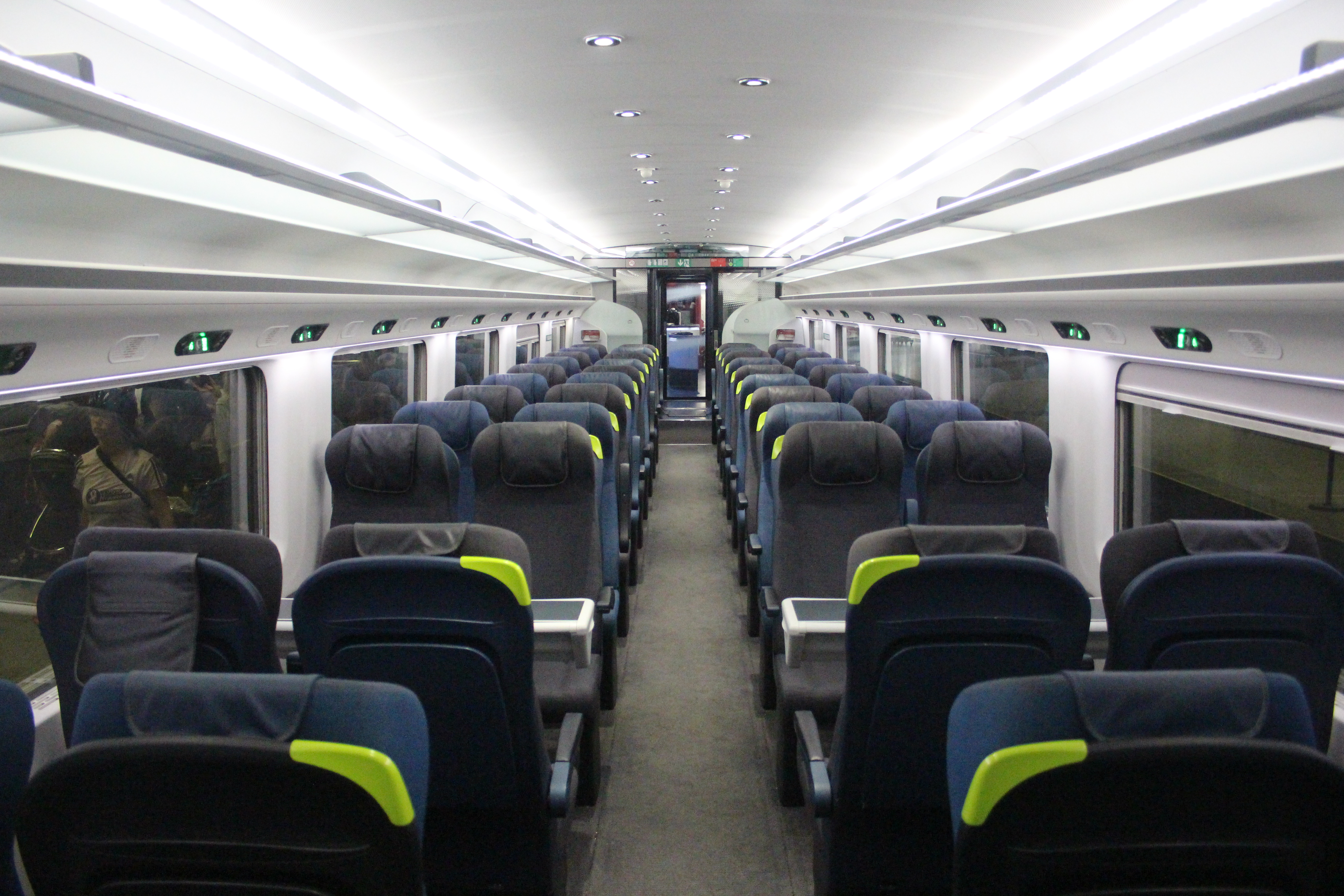
- The standard-class interior of a refurbished Class 373
- Stock type: Electric multiple unit
- In service: 14 November 1994 – present
- Manufacturers: GEC Alsthom; Brugeoise et Nivelles; Metro-Cammell
- Built at: La Rochelle, France; Belfort, France; Washwood Heath, England; Bruges, Belgium
- Family name: TGV
- Constructed: 1992–1996
- Number built: 38 (31 × Three Capitals, 7 × North of London)
- Number in service: 11
- Number scrapped: 17
- Successor: Class 374 (e320); TGV Duplex
- Formation: Three Capitals: 20 cars; North of London: 16 cars; (See § Set formation)
- Capacity: Three Capitals as built: 750 seats; Three Capitals refurb.: 758 seats; North of London: 558 seats
- Operator: Eurostar
- Depots: Current: Temple Mills (UK); Technicentre du Landy (France); Former: North Pole (UK)

Specifications
- Car body construction: Steel
- Train length: 394 m (1,292 ft 8 in)
- Car length: Driving vehicles: 22.15 m (72 ft 8 in); Vehicles with one full bogie: (Note: MS and TBF vehicles in the § Set formation table.); 21.84 m (71 ft 8 in); Intermediate trailers: 18.70 m (61 ft 4 in)
- Width: 2.81 m (9 ft 3 in)
- Doors: Single-Leaf Sliding Plug
- Wheel diameter: 900 mm (2 ft 11 in)
- Maximum speed: 300 km/h (186 mph)
- Weight: Three Capitals empty: 752 t (1,658,000 lb); Three Capitals loaded: 815 t (1,797,000 lb); North of London: 665 t (1,466,000 lb)
- Traction system: GEC-Alsthom GTO-VVVF
- Traction motors: 12 × Brush TM2151B asynchronous three-phase AC; (max 1,020 kW (1,370 hp) each)
- Power output: On 25 kV: 12.24 MW (16,414 hp); On 3,000 V: 5.70 MW (7,644 hp); On 675 V: 3.40 MW (4,559 hp)
- Tractive effort: Starting: 410 kN (92,172 lb_{f}) on 25 kV; 350 kN (78,683 lb_{f}) on 1.5 kV or 675 V; Continuous: 220 kN (49,458 lb_{f}) @ 200 km/h (124 mph) on 25 kV
- Gear ratio: 1:2.19
- Electric systems: Overhead line: 25 kV 50 Hz AC; 3,000 V DC; 1,500 V DC; Third rail, 750 V DC (removed)
- Current collection: Pantograph; Contact shoes (removed)
- UIC classification: (See § Set formation)
- Safety systems: AWS; KVB; TBL; TPWS; TVM-430
- Coupling system: Scharfenberg (for rescue only)
- Multiple working: Not fitted
- Track gauge: 1,435 mm (4 ft 8 1/2 in) standard gauge

The British Rail Class 373 (known in France as the TGV TMST and branded by Eurostar as the Eurostar e300) is a French designed and Anglo-French built electric multiple unit train that is used for Eurostar international high-speed rail services from the United Kingdom to France and Belgium through the Channel Tunnel. Part of the TGV family, it was built with a smaller cross-section to fit the smaller loading gauge in Britain, was originally capable of operating on the UK third rail network, and has extensive fireproofing in case of fire in the tunnel. It is both the second longest—387 metres (1,270 ft)—and second fastest train in regular UK passenger service, operating at speeds of up to 300 kilometres per hour (186 mph).

Known as the TransManche Super Train (TMST), or Cross-channel Super Train, before being introduced in 1993, the train is designated Class 373 under the British TOPS classification system and series 373000 TGV in France. It was built by the Anglo-French company GEC-Alsthom at its factories in La Rochelle (France), Belfort (France) and Washwood Heath (Britain) and by Brugeoise et Nivelles (BN, now part of Alstom) in Bruges (Belgium).

Since the introduction of the new Class 374 e320 units from Siemens in 2015, refurbished versions of the Class 373 or TGV-TMST sets have been officially referred to as e300 by Eurostar to distinguish them from the new Velaro-based e320 fleet.

== Types ==
Two types of Class 373 were constructed:

- 31 Three Capitals sets consisting of two power cars and 18 passenger coaches, 394 metres (1,292 ft 8 in) long and have 750 seats: 206 in first class, 544 in standard class. The length of a complete set is dictated by the Channel Tunnel safety regulations, as the distance between consecutive cross passages is 375 metres (1,230 ft 4 in). This means that, if a Eurostar train has to stop inside the Tunnel in case of fire or other emergencies, it would always stop adjacent to a cross passage.
- Seven North of London sets (known as "Regional" Eurostars) with 14 coaches and two power cars, they are 312.36 metres (1,024 ft 10 in) in length and have 558 seats: (114 in first class, 444 in standard class).

The North of London sets were intended to provide Regional Eurostar services from continental Europe to and from north of London, using the West Coast Main Line and the East Coast Main Line, but these services never came to fruition because of long proposed journey times and the proliferation of budget airlines offering cheaper fares; there were also issues with the relatively crude design of British Rail overhead electrified lines and problems with finding suitable routes within Greater London.

== Construction ==
The sets were ordered by the railway companies involved: 16 by SNCF, four by NMBS/SNCB, and 18 by British Rail, of which seven were the North of London sets. Upon the privatisation of British Rail, the BR sets were bought by London and Continental Railways, which named its subsidiary Eurostar (UK) Limited, now managed by SNCF (55%), LCR (40%) and SNCB (5%).

The first Eurostar Class 373 set, 373001/373002, was built at Belfort in 1992. Identified as "PS1" (Pre-Series 1), it was formed of two power cars and seven coaches, and was delivered for test running in January 1993. Its first powered runs were between Strasbourg and Mulhouse, and it was transferred to the UK for third-rail DC tests in June 1993. Full-length pre-series train PS2 was completed in May 1993.

To test the 750 V DC third rail shoes needed on the Southern Region lines in Great Britain, an eight-vehicle locomotive-hauled train was used in early 1994, consisting of a Class 73 locomotive (73205), a converted Class 33 locomotive acting as a Driving Brake Van (33115, reclassified as NZ under TOPS), and six carriages from Class 438 (4TC) multiple units 8007, 8023 and 8028.

An extra power car, numbered 3999, was built as a spare. This was required for a couple of years, when 3999 was renumbered and replaced another power car whilst it underwent rebuilding at Le Landy. It was overhauled and renumbered 3204 in 2016.

== Mid-life update ==
The 22 sets still operating for Eurostar were refurbished in 2004/05 with a new interior, designed by Philippe Starck. The grey-yellow look in standard class and the grey-red look in first class were replaced with a more grey-brown scheme in standard and a grey-burnt orange in first class.

In 2008, Eurostar announced that it was beginning the process to institute a mid-life update, which would not include the Class 373 sets being used by SNCF in France. As a part of the update process, the Italian company Pininfarina was contracted to redesign the interiors; the first refurbished Eurostar was not originally due in service until 2012. The refurbishment programme would also include an engine maintenance and a new external livery. Eurostar later planned for the process to be complete by 2014, allowing the fleet to remain in service beyond 2020, but following additional delays the first refurbished train was not completed until July 2015.

== Maintenance ==
When Eurostar services ran from London Waterloo International, maintenance was carried out at North Pole Depot in West London, next to the Great Western Main Line. Since November 2007, Eurostar maintains its Class 373 fleets at Temple Mills Depot in East London; in France the trains are maintained at Le Landy depot in Paris, and Brussels Forest/Vorst depot.

== Current operators ==
=== Eurostar ===
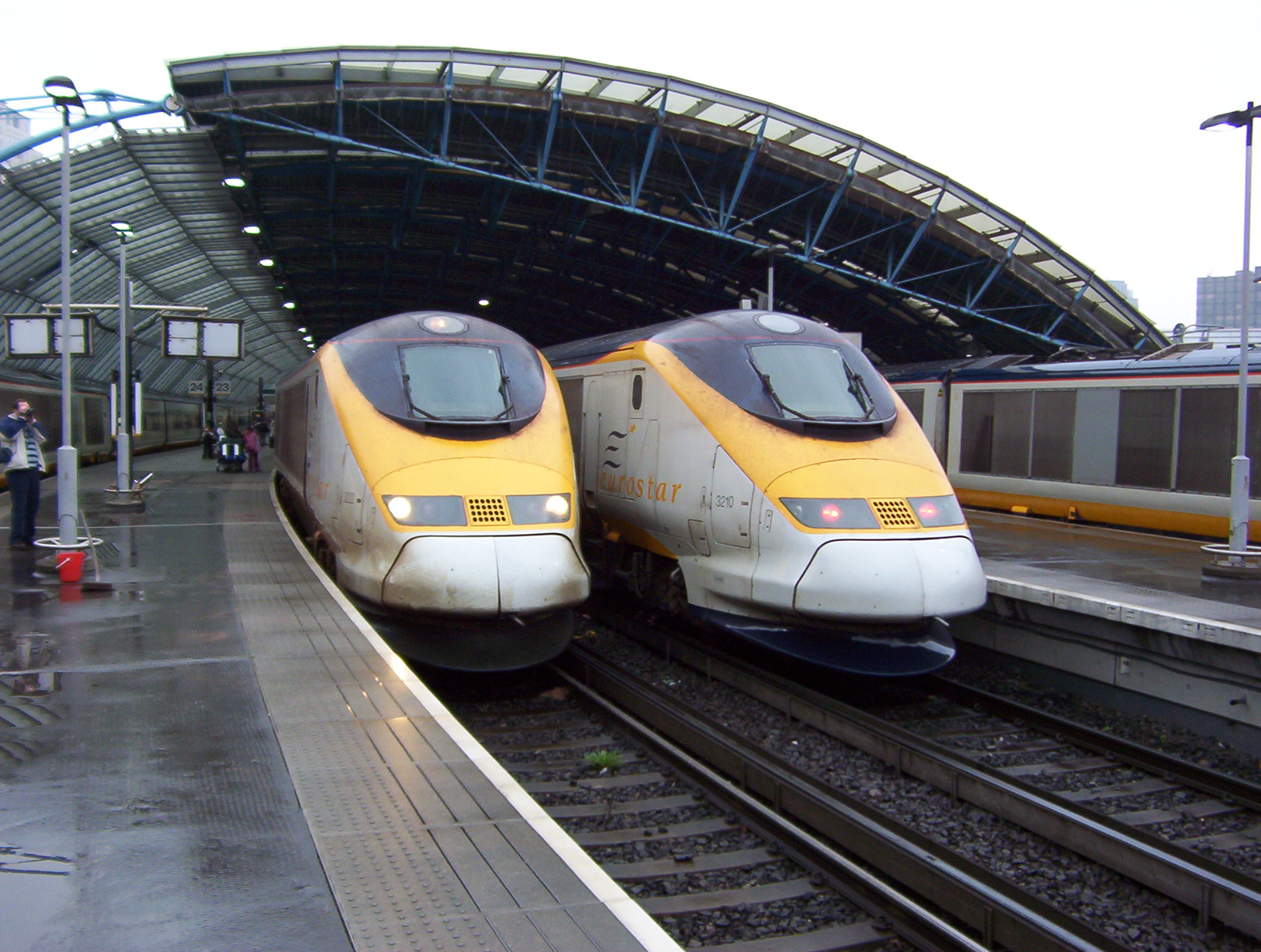
Class 373s in the original Eurostar livery lined up at the former Waterloo International

Eurostar originally ran services to and from Waterloo International along existing mainline tracks, until it moved to St Pancras International in November 2007.

In October 2010, Eurostar ordered ten Class 374 Eurostar e320 trains from Siemens to run on its existing routes from London to Paris and Brussels as well the newest route to Amsterdam alongside its Class 373 fleet. In 2016, Eurostar announced that it would retain eight Class 373 once the full Class 374 (e320) fleet were in service; the rest of the Class 373 were either stored or scrapped.

As of 2020, eight trains had been refurbished with an additional three un-refurbished units in service.

Following the COVID-19 pandemic e300 trains now run from London to Paris and Brussels with the e320s, as well as exclusively operating the winter ski service to Bourg-Saint-Maurice.

== Former operators ==
=== Great North Eastern Railway ===
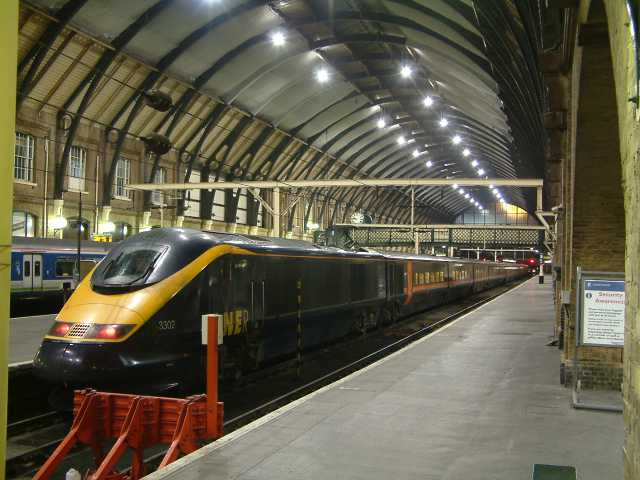
Regional Eurostar set at London King's Cross in 2004

In May 2000, two Regional Eurostar sets were leased to GNER to operate The White Rose services from London King's Cross to York. From May 2002, the White Rose was altered to operate to Leeds with a third set leased. Sets 3301–3306 all had GNER livery applied, whereas the rest carried the original Eurostar livery without logos.

The lease expired in December 2005 and they were handed back to Eurostar; they were later used to operate high speed TGV services with SNCF in northern France.

When being used for GNER services, the doors of the first and last carriages were locked out of use at some stations due to the units being too long to stop in the platforms.

Due to restrictions in the power supply on the Hertford Loop Line, only one set was permitted to operate on that route at any one time. They were only allowed to run from King's Cross to York and Leeds because of gauging on the bridges approaching Newcastle. They were not allowed to travel to Bradford Forster Square because the electrical infrastructure beyond Leeds was insufficient. Manually locked selective door opening was used at shorter platforms.

=== SNCF ===
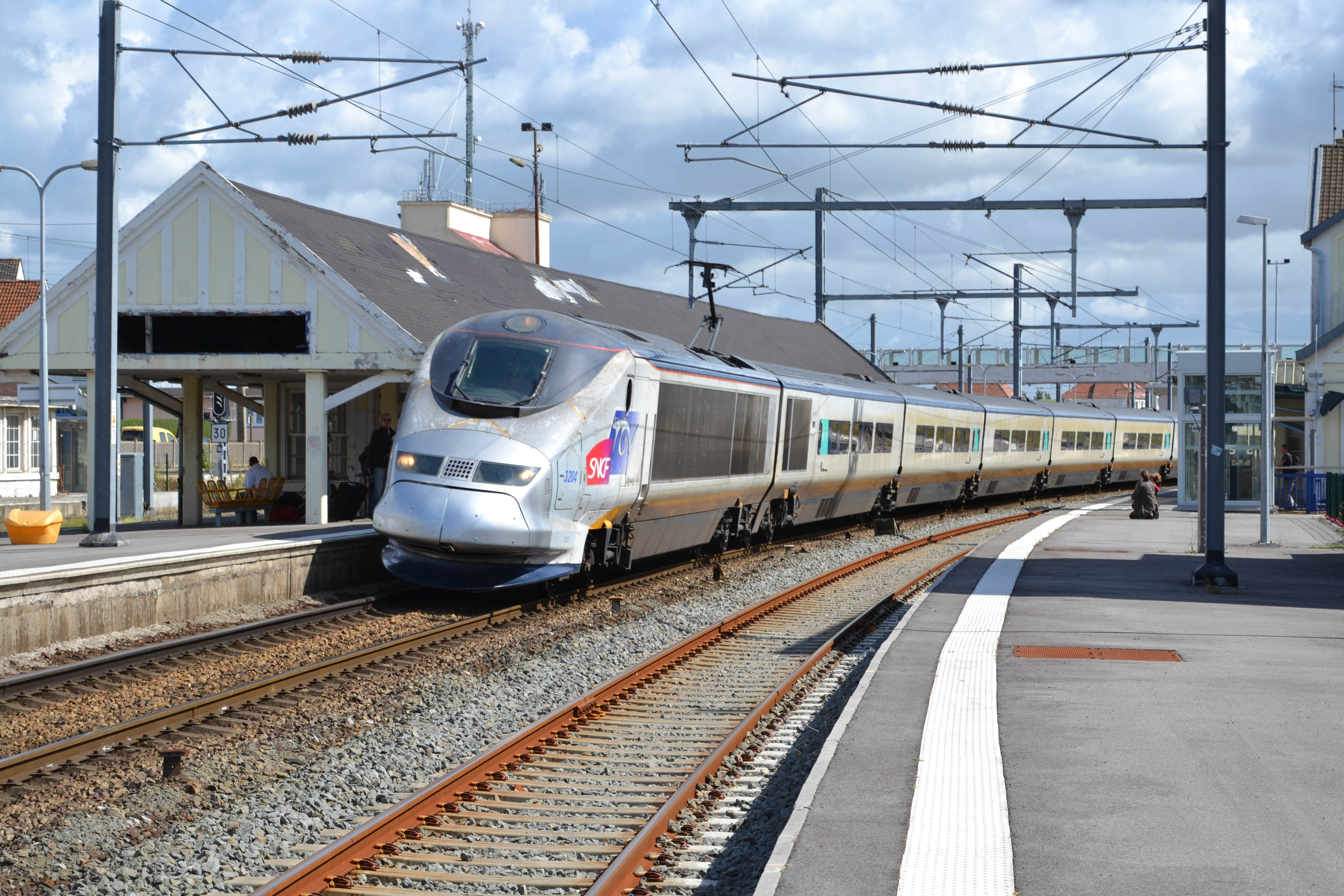
Class 373/2 working for SNCF passing Étaples - Le Touquet

SNCF leased three of Eurostar's "Three Capitals" sets for use on French domestic TGV services (mainly between Paris and Lille). The sets remained in the original Eurostar livery with SNCF branding, and some sets had greyish white or silver front ends. In 2007, SNCF added more Class 373 sets to its fleet by leasing the redundant "North of London" sets from Eurostar. SNCF's lease of the sets was scheduled to last until 2011 with the option to keep the sets running for another two years.

In October 2014, the three "Three Capitals" sets were withdrawn from traffic and stored, having been replaced by TGV Duplex sets. Some have since been scrapped having provided spare parts to other Class 373 sets with remaining sets still stored in Ambérieu, France.

=== IZY ===
In November 2018, a Class 373 set consisting of 373213 and 373224 was introduced into service by IZY, the low-cost service that used to run between Paris and Brussels by Thalys, replacing a TGV Réseau train.

== Fleet information ==
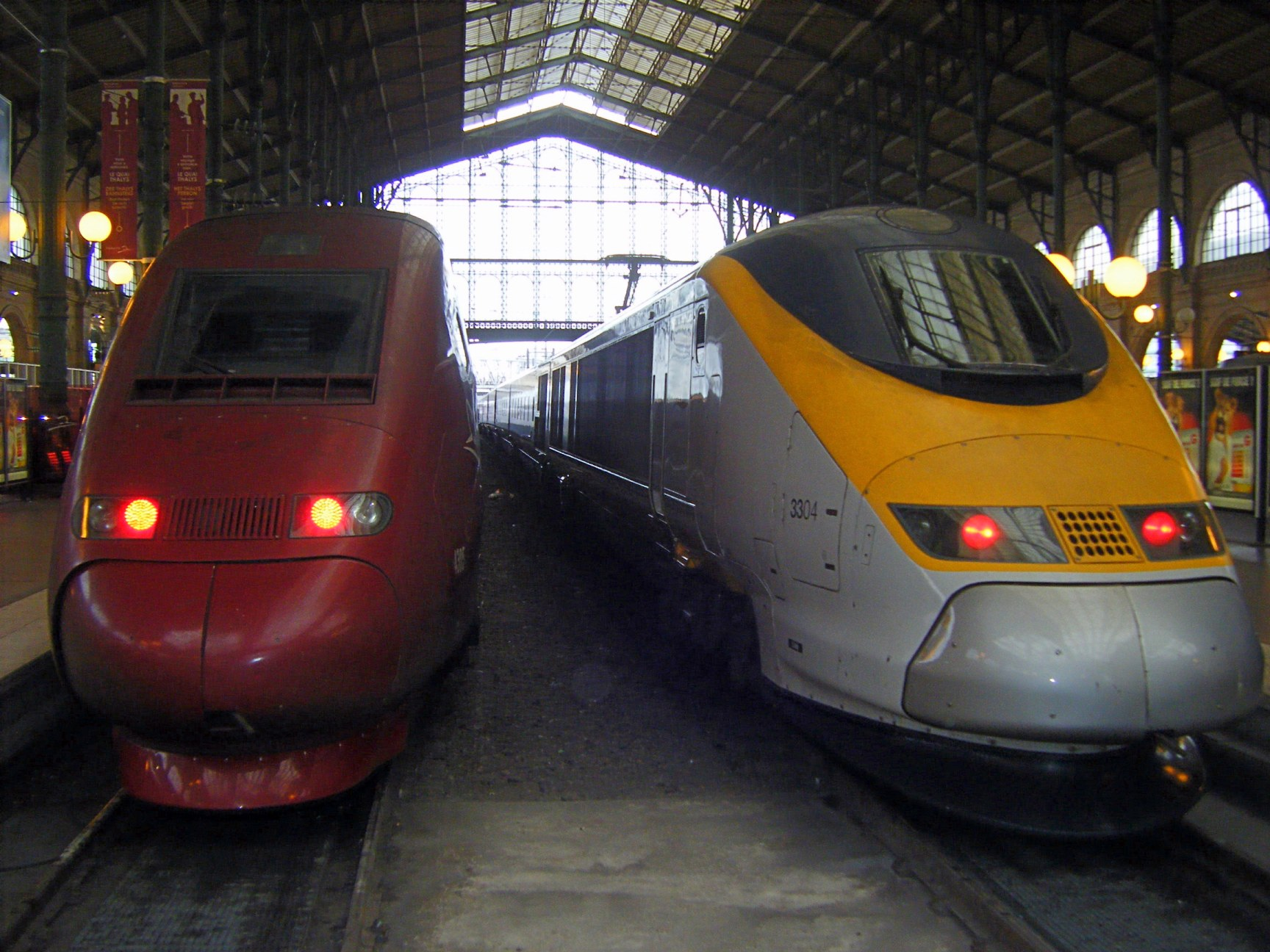
A Thalys PBKA TGV set with Class 373 at Paris (Gare du Nord)

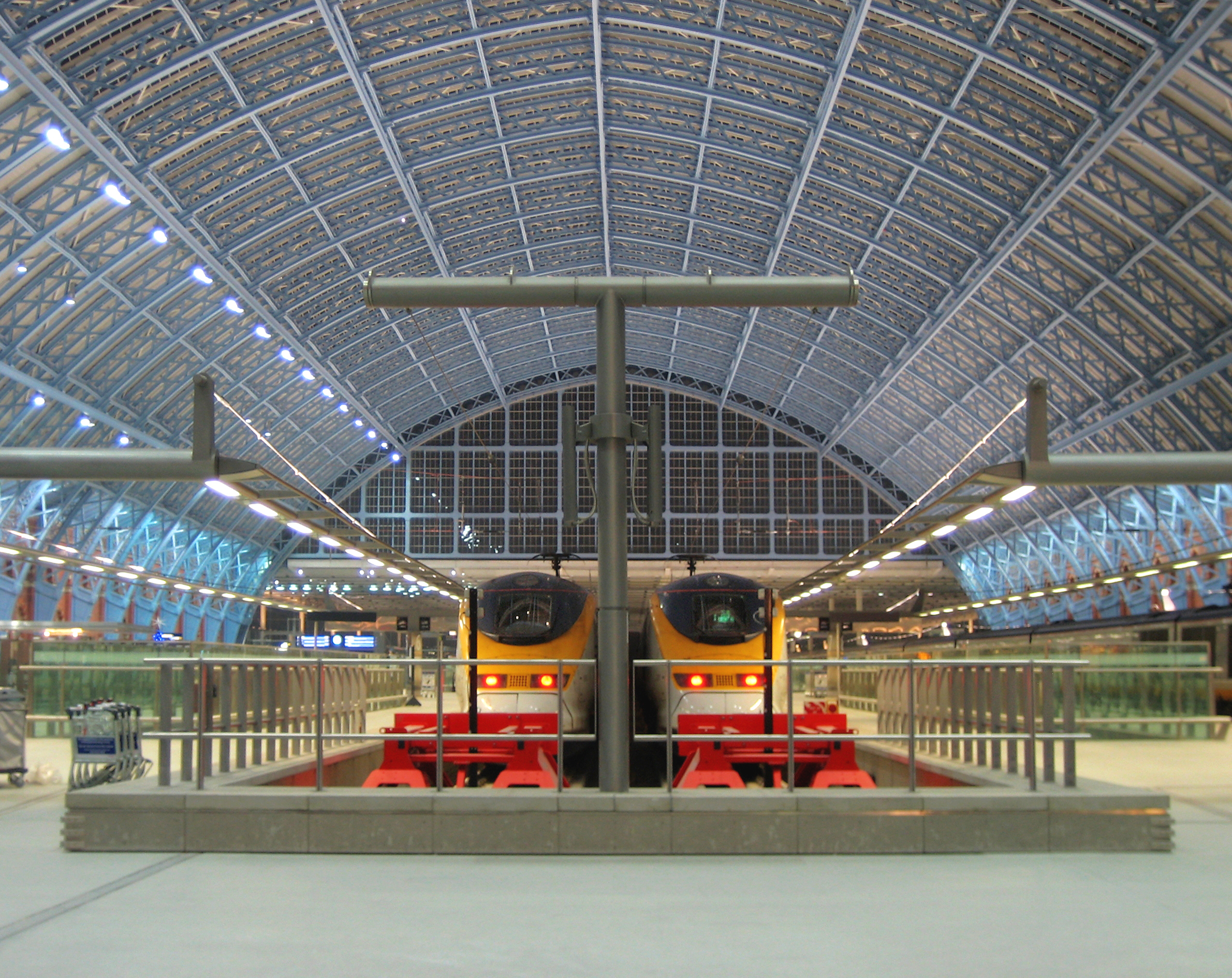
Eurostar 373 sets at London St Pancras International

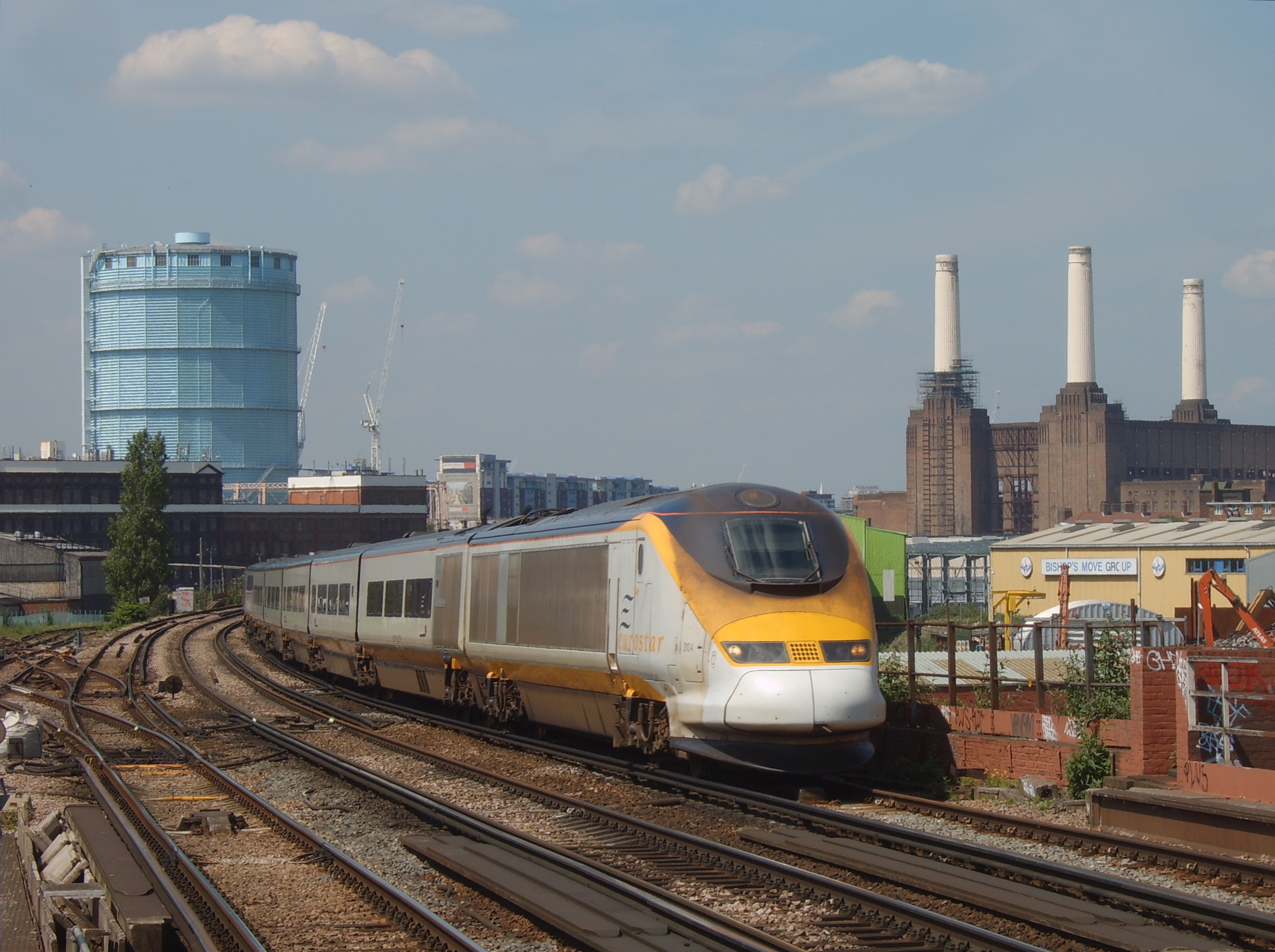
Class 373 passes Wandsworth Road in London

Each power car has a four-digit number starting with "3" (3xxx). This designates the train as a Mark 3 TGV (Mark 1 being SNCF TGV Sud-Est; and Mark 2 being SNCF TGV Atlantique). The last digit denotes the country of ownership:

- 3730xx: UK
- 3731xx: Belgium
- 3732xx: France
- 3733xx: "Regional" and "North of London" Eurostar sets
- 373999: Spare Powercar

Each half-set is numbered separately.

Class	No. built	Unit number range	Cars per half-set (Note: including power car.)	Description	Operators	Unit numbers	Services operated
Class 373/0	22	373001–373022	10	BR sets	Eurostar	373001/373002; 373007-373018; 373021/373022	London to Paris (Gare du Nord); London to Brussels; London to Marne-la-Vallée (for Disneyland Paris); London to Marseille Saint-Charles (Note: Avignon and Alps ski-train services are worked by SNCF quad-voltage sets.); London to Bourg St Maurice
Class 373/1	8	373101-373108	10	NMBS sets	Eurostar	373101-373108	London to Paris (Gare du Nord); London to Brussels; London to Marne-la-Vallée (for Disneyland Paris); London to Marseille Saint-Charles; London to Bourg St Maurice
Class 373/2	32	373201-373232	10	SNCF sets	Eurostar	373201/373202; 373205–373212; 373214-373223; 373229–373232	London to Paris (Gare du Nord); London to Brussels; London to Marne-la-Vallée (for Disneyland Paris); London to Marseille Saint-Charles; London to Bourg St Maurice
Class 373/2	32	373201-373232	10	SNCF sets	IZY	373213/373224	Paris to Brussels
Class 373/2	32	373201-373232	10	SNCF sets	SNCF	373203/373204/373225/373226/373227/373228	It was withdrawn in October 2014.
Class 373/3	14	373301–373314	8	BR's NoL sets	Eurostar	373301-373314	Former SNCF hired to operate.
Spare powercars	1	373999			Eurostar	373999	Used as a refurbished and spare vehicle.

=== Travel classes ===
Eurostar operates three classes of travel on its Class 373 trains:

- Standard class, with two seats each side of the aisle, predominantly airline-style with a small number of seats around tables.
- Standard Premier class, with wider seats, two on one side and one on the other, predominantly with tables but with some single and duo seats. A light meal and drinks are included in the fare.
- Business Premier class, with the same seats as Standard Premier. A full hot meal and drinks are included in the fare, along with lounge access, fast track access to security checkpoints, the ability to arrive 10 minutes before travel, and other amenities.

As Standard Premier and Business Premier use the same seating, the number of carriages allocated to each class may be varied in line with demand.

For the purpose of travel with Interrail, Eurail, and similar passes, Standard class is considered 2nd class and Standard Premier class is considered 1st class. Business Premier is considered to be above 1st class and pass users cannot travel in Business Premier without purchasing a full public rate ticket.

=== Train layout ===
Each Three Capitals set is formed of two power cars and 18 coaches. North of London and Regional Eurostar sets are formed of two power cars and 14 coaches:

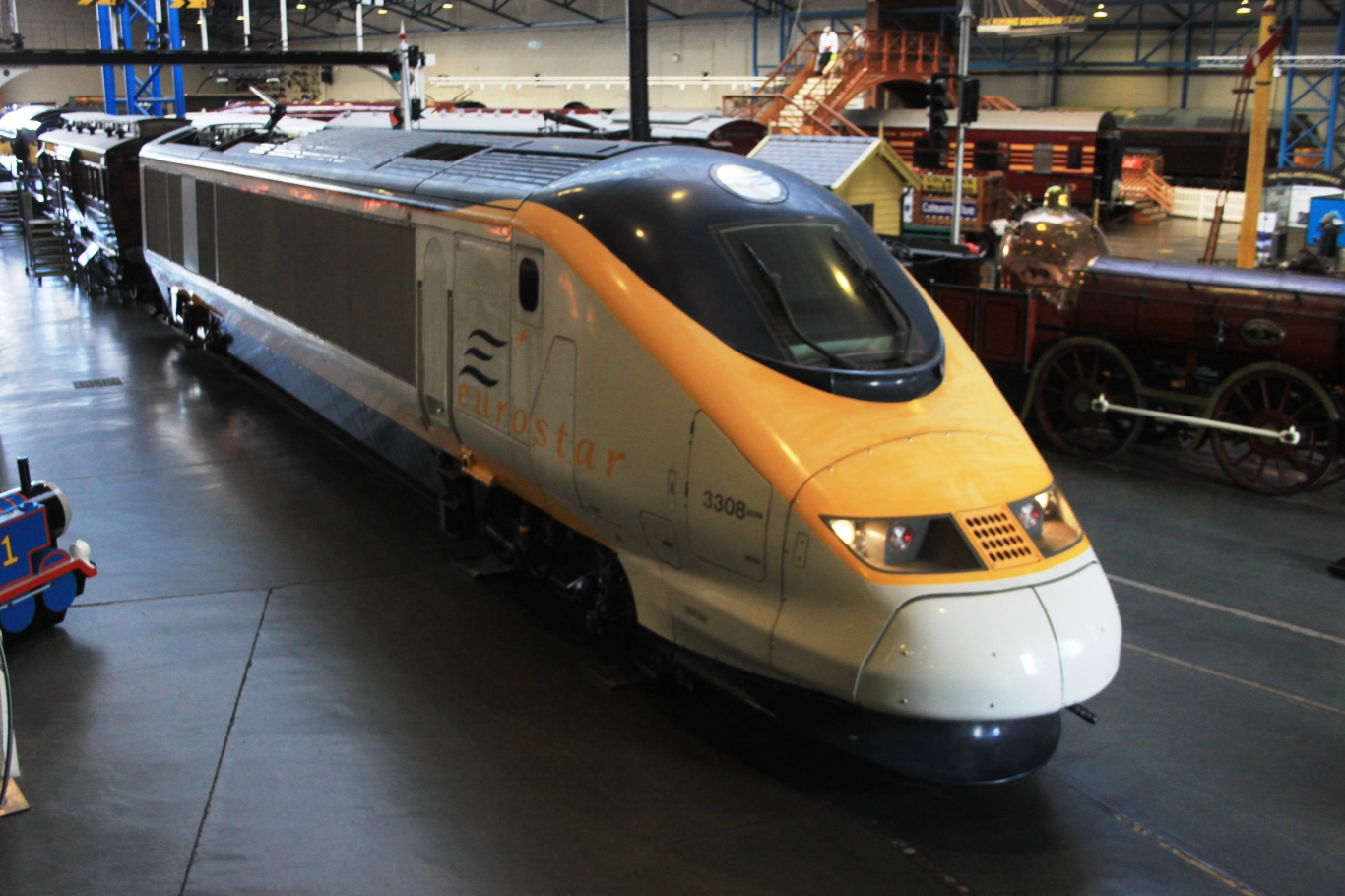
Class 373 373308 on display at the National Railway Museum, York

=== Fleet list ===
Key:	In service	Refurbished and in service	In storage	Scrapped	Preserved

Power car number	Operator	Status	Notes
373001/373002	Eurostar	Scrapped	Scrapped 18 March 2018 at European Metal Recycling, Kingsbury
373003/373004	Eurostar	Scrapped	Scrapped 15 December 2016 at European Metal Recycling, Kingsbury
373005/373006	Eurostar	Scrapped	Scrapped 27 October 2016 at European Metal Recycling, Kingsbury
373007/373008	Eurostar	In service	Refurbished and in service
373009/373010	Eurostar	Scrapped	Scrapped 19 January 2018 at European Metal Recycling, Kingsbury
373011/373012	Eurostar	Scrapped	Scrapped 17 February 2018 at European Metal Recycling, Kingsbury
373013/373014	Eurostar	Scrapped	Scrapped 17 March 2017 at European Metal Recycling, Kingsbury
373015/373016	Eurostar	In service	Refurbished and in service
373017/373018	Eurostar	Scrapped	Scrapped March 2018 at the SNCF yard in Valenciennes
373019/373020	Eurostar	Scrapped	Scrapped 2 December 2016 at European Metal Recycling, Kingsbury
373021/373022	Eurostar	Scrapped	
373101 (Note: Power car only)	Eurostar	Preserved	Withdrawn 8 August 2017, preserved at National College for Advanced Transport and Infrastructure, Doncaster
373102	Eurostar	Preserved	Withdrawn 17 August 2017, preserved at National College for Advanced Transport and Infrastructure, Birmingham
373103/373104	Eurostar	Scrapped	Scrapped 24 November 2017 at European Metal Recycling, Kingsbury
373105	Eurostar	In storage	
373106	Eurostar	Preserved	Preserved at Train World, Schaerbeek, near Brussels
373107/373108	Eurostar	Scrapped	Scrapped 1 February 2017 at European Metal Recycling, Kingsbury
373201/373202	Eurostar	Scrapped	Scrapped 25 May 2018 at European Metal Recycling, Kingsbury
373203/373204	SNCF	Scrapped	Scrapped 23 September 2014 at the SNCF yard in Vaires-sur-Marne
373205/373206	Eurostar	In service	Refurbished and in service
373207/373208	Eurostar	In storage	
373209/373210	Eurostar	In service	Refurbished and in service
373211/373212	Eurostar	In service	Refurbished and in service
373213/373224	IZY	Scrapped	Scrapped at Culoz, France in April 2025
373215/373216	Eurostar	In service	
373217/373218	Eurostar	In service	
373219/373220	Eurostar	In service	Refurbished and in service
373221/373222	Eurostar	In service	Refurbished and in service
373223/373214	Eurostar	In service	
373225/373226	SNCF	Scrapped	Scrapped at the SNCF Yard, Culoz
373227/373228	SNCF	Scrapped	Scrapped 17 May 2017 at the SNCF Technicentre, Romilly-sur-Seine
373229/373230	Eurostar	In service	Refurbished and in service
373231/373232	Eurostar	Scrapped	Scrapped 22 September 2017 at European Metal Recycling, Kingsbury
373301/373302	Eurostar	In storage	
373303	Eurostar	In storage	
373304	Eurostar	Preserved	preserved at One:One Collection, Margate Power car + a single coach
373305/373306	Eurostar	In storage	
373307	Eurostar	In storage	
373308	Eurostar	Preserved	Withdrawn 7 August 2015, preserved at National Railway Museum, York
373309/373310	Eurostar	In storage	
373311/373312	Eurostar	In storage	
373313/373314	Eurostar	In storage	3314 to be plinthed at Temple Mills
373999	Eurostar	In service	Spare power car, refurbished

Named units (All since removed)

Set	Name
373001/373002	Tread Lightly / Voyage Vert
373003/373004	Tri-City-Athlon 2010
373007/373008	Waterloo Sunset
373009/373010	Remembering Fromelles
373013/373014	London 2012
373207/373208	Michel Hollard
373209/373210	The Da Vinci Code
373301/373302	The White Rose
373303/373304	The White Rose
373305/373306	Yorkshire Forward
373313/373314	Entente Cordiale

== Technical details ==
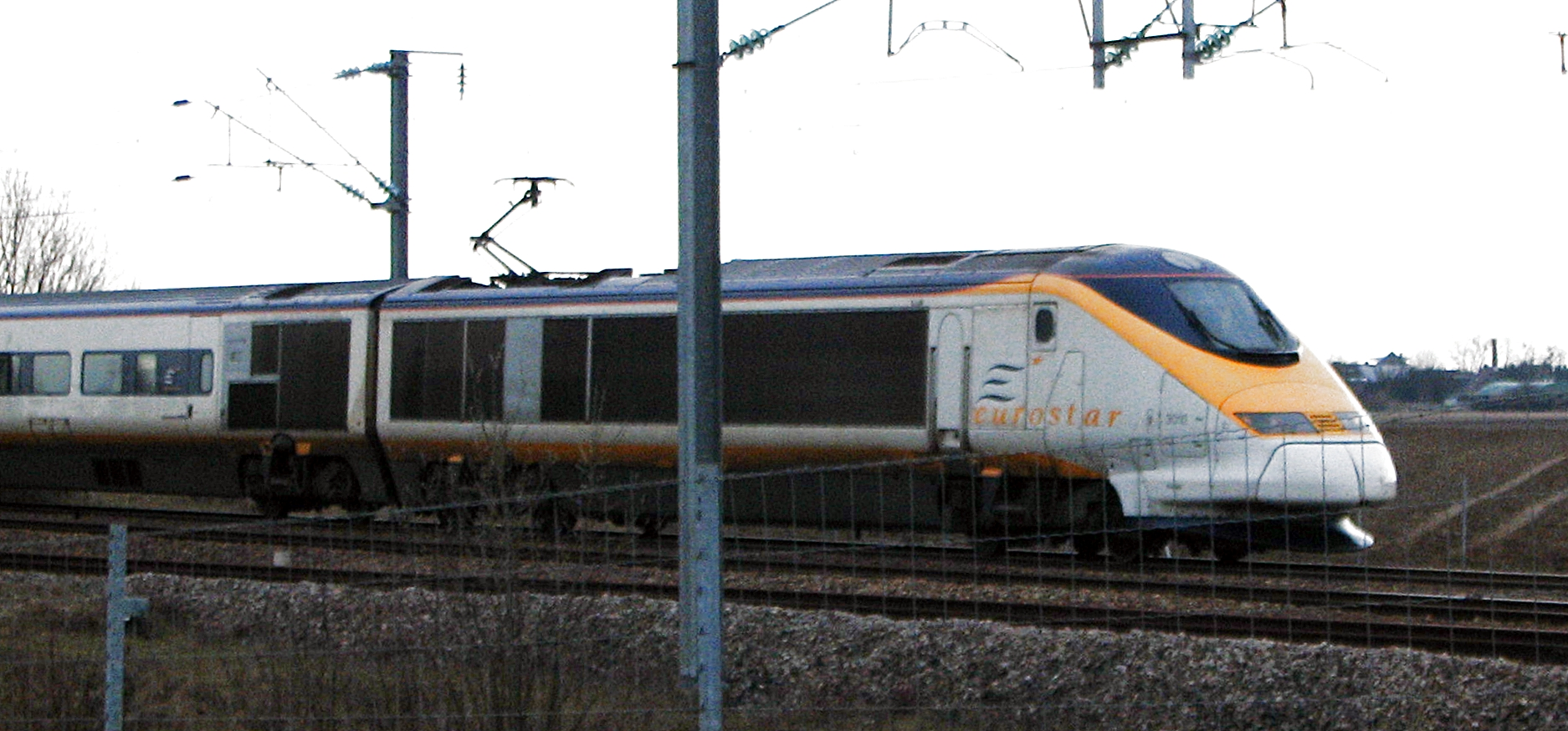
Eurostar Class 373 on LGV Interconnexion Est, near Chennevières-lès-Louvres, Val d'Oise, France

=== Power ===
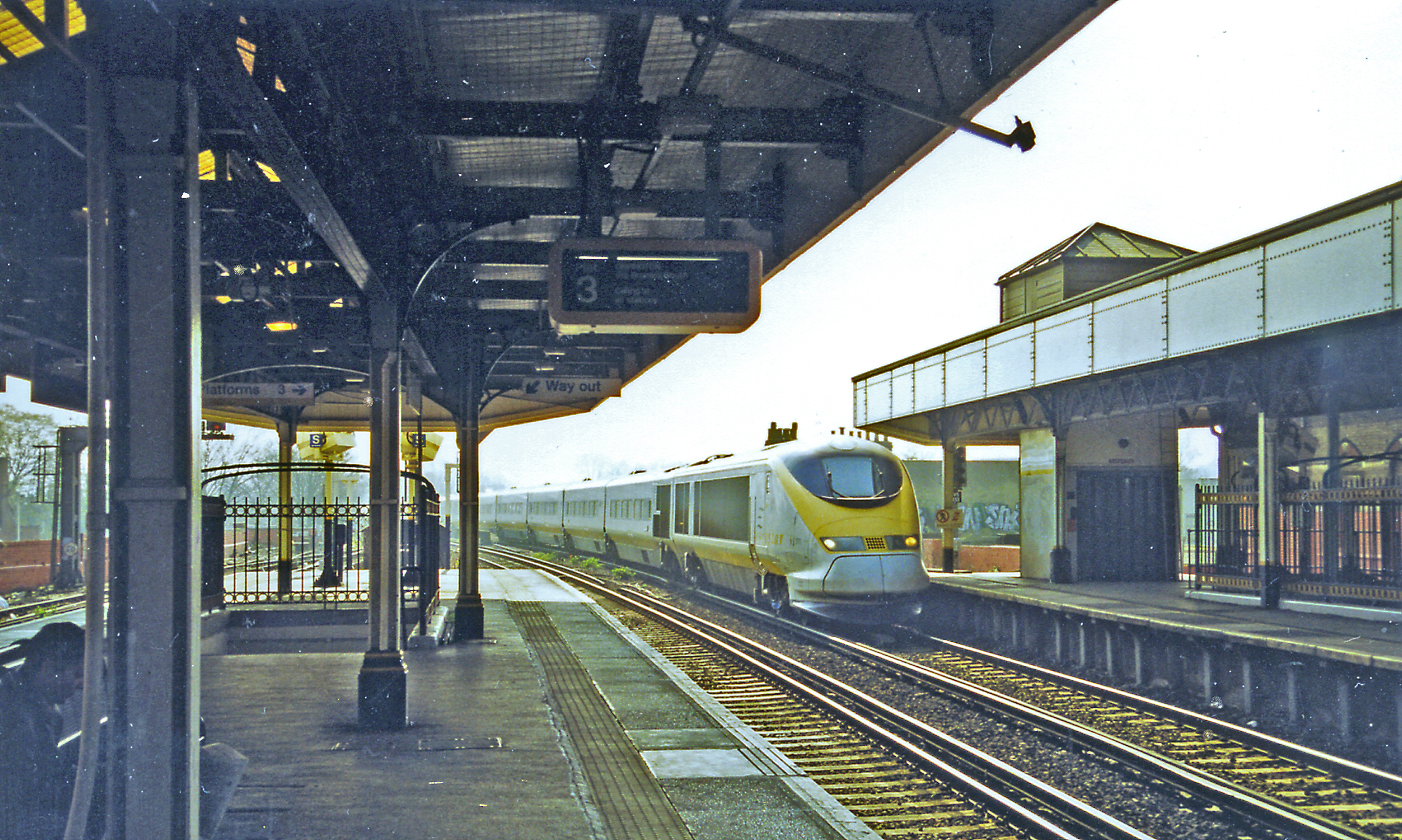
A Class 373 passes Herne Hill in 2000

All Class 373 sets were built as tri-voltage, able to operate on 25 kV 50 Hz AC (LGVs (French high-speed lines), Eurotunnel, High Speed 1, UK overhead electrified lines) and 3,000 V DC (Belgian classic lines) using pantographs, and 750 V DC (UK third rail network) using third-rail pick-up shoes. The shoes were retracted when switching to overhead power. After the opening of High Speed 1 in 2007, overhead electrification is used throughout; consequently, the third rail shoes were removed. Five of the SNCF-owned sets are quadri-voltage, able to operate from 1,500 V DC (French lignes classiques) in the south of France, used on London–Avignon and ski services.

The trains are powered by asynchronous traction motors. There are four powered axles in each power car and two powered axles in the outer bogie of the front passenger coach (a layout used on the original SNCF TGV Sud-Est (PSE) sets) giving twelve powered axles. Each set draws up to 16 MW with 12 MW (16,092 hp) of traction power, but this provides the lowest power-to-weight ratio in the TGV family.

The class uses five different standards of overhead: domestic catenary in each of Belgium, France and the United Kingdom; fixed-height catenary on LGV lines and HS1; and taller catenary in the Channel Tunnel, designed to accommodate double-deck car-carrying trains and roll-on roll-off heavy goods vehicle trains. The driver must manually lower and then raise the pantograph during the transition between catenary systems.

=== Signalling systems ===
The Class 373s are fitted with a wide range of signalling systems, these include:

- AWS (Automatic Warning System), the British signalling system, only used when services call at Ashford International
- TPWS (Train Protection & Warning System), the safety system that works with the AWS, only used when services call at Ashford International
- TVM (Transmission Voie-Machine), used on LGV ("lignes à grande vitesse"), Eurotunnel, HS1 and HSL 1
- KVB (Contrôle de vitesse par balises), used between Paris Gare du Nord and LGV Nord, on French Classic Lines and on the HS1 connected throat around London St Pancras. It is electro-mechanical with fixed radio beacons.
- TBL, (the Belgian signalling system,) electro-mechanical, used between Brussels-South/Midi and HSL 1, Belgium.

When travelling at high speeds, it is not possible for the driver to accurately see colour-light signals at the side of the track. With the TVM signalling used on the high-speed lines, the target speed for the end of the current block is displayed with a flashing indication on the in-cab display for the next block if it is at a different speed. Auxiliary signalling information, including the location of neutral sections in the overhead supply and pantograph adjustment zones, is displayed in cab and by the lineside. The operation of circuit breakers over neutral sections is handled automatically on TVM-signalled lines only, and pantograph adjustments must always be manually performed by the driver.

=== Bogies and couplings ===
The Class 373 was designed to comply with the Channel Tunnel safety regulations, and consists of two independent half-sets, each with its own power car. Most of the trailer cars are supported on Jacobs bogies shared between adjacent coaches, supporting both of them, with the cars next to the power cars and the two middle coaches (carriages 9 and 10 in a full-length set) not articulated. Non-shared bogies are coupled with Scharfenberg couplers, providing three points for separation in the event of an emergency in the tunnel. The electrical supply cables between a power car and the first carriage are designed to break apart during an emergency separation. In the event of a serious fire in the tunnel the passengers would be transferred into the undamaged half of the train, which would then be uncoupled from the damaged half and driven out of the tunnel. If the undamaged part is the rear half of the train, this would be driven by the guard who is a fully authorised driver and occupies the rear driving cab in the tunnel for this purpose. Due to limitations on driving hours, the driver and guard exchange roles for the return journey.

The articulated design is advantageous during a derailment as the carriages will tend to stay aligned. On non-articulated trains couplings may break and the carriages may jackknife. A disadvantage of articulation is that it is difficult to remove and separate the individual carriages for maintenance. Although the power cars can be uncoupled, specialised depot equipment is needed to split carriages by lifting the entire train at once. Once uncoupled, one of the carriage ends is left without a bogie at the point of separation, so a bogie frame is required to support it.

=== Braking systems ===
The Class 373s use three braking systems:

- The 12 traction motors can provide dynamic braking,
- All non-powered axles have disc brakes,
- All powered axles have tread (clasp) brakes with cast iron shoes.

A train travelling at 300 km/h (186 mph) can slow down to stop in 65 seconds, during which time the braking distance is about 2.7 km (1.7 miles).

=== Miscellaneous ===
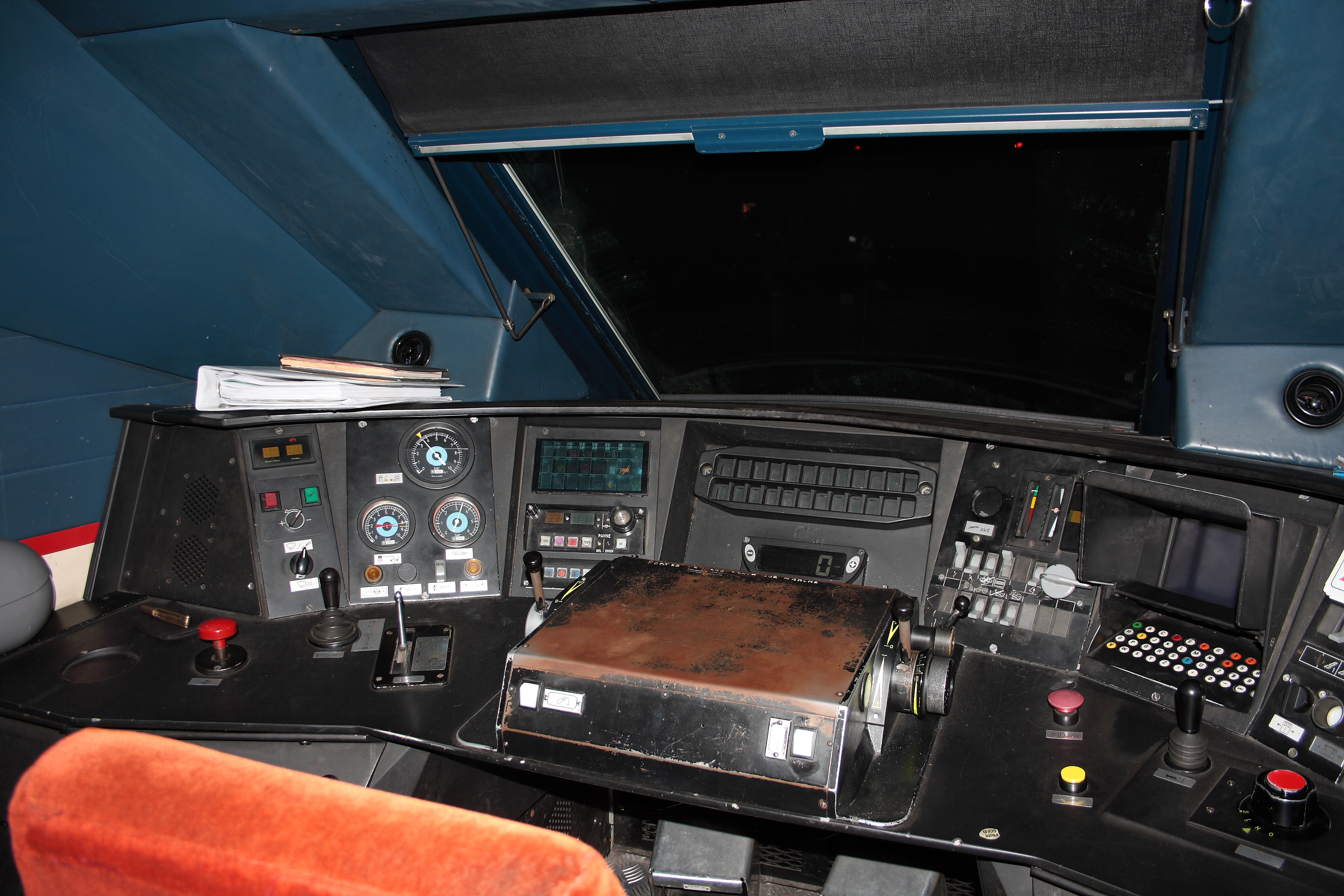
The driving cab

To combat the hypnotic effect of driving through the tunnel at speed for 20 minutes, the power cars have a very small windscreen when compared to other high-speed trains and TGVs.

== Significant events ==
=== Accidents and incidents ===
There have been several minor incidents. In October 1994, there were teething problems relating to the start of operations. The first preview train, carrying 400 members of the press and media, was delayed for two hours by technical issues. On 29 May 2002, a train was accidentally routed towards London Victoria instead of London Waterloo, causing it to arrive 25 minutes late. The signalling error that caused the incorrect routeing was stated to have caused "no risk" as a result.

On 5 June 2000, 373101/102, while working a Paris to London service, derailed on LGV Nord near Arras, France at 180 mph (290 km/h). 14 people were treated for light injuries or shock, with no serious injuries or deaths. The articulated design was credited with maintaining stability during the incident and the train stayed upright. After investigation, the incident was blamed on a component of the transmission between the motors and axles coming loose. To reduce the unsprung mass, TGV trains have the motors mounted on the car body rather than the bogies. In order for the train to be able to manoeuvre around curves, a sliding tripod assembly is used, which became dislodged.

During the night of 18–19 December 2009, there was heavy snow causing widespread disruption to roads, railways and airports across northern Europe. Five trains, one of which was 373217 + 373218, broke down inside the Channel Tunnel because snow in the engine compartment was quickly melted by the warmer temperatures in the tunnel, the resulting water causing electrical and control system faults. Eurostar commissioned an independent report to evaluate what went wrong and how future events could be prevented or better managed. The report's recommendations included:

- Increased number of diesel rescue locomotives with exhaust filtration to be on standby at each end of the tunnel.
- Major changes to the power cars to prevent snow ingress into electrical compartments.
- Better staff training.
- Improved communication internally and with other stakeholders (Eurotunnel and emergency services).
- Better information provision to passengers.

The majority of the recommendations were implemented by 23 October 2012.

=== Record runs ===
On 30 July 2003, on the opening press run of the Channel Tunnel Rail Link Section 1, 373313/314 established a new British rail speed record of 334.7 km/h (208.0 mph), breaking the previous record of 261.0 km/h (162.2 mph) set by an Advanced Passenger Train on 20 December 1979.

On 16 May 2006, 373209/210 created a record for the longest non-stop high-speed journey when it made the 1,421 km (883 mi) journey from London to Cannes in 7 hours 25 minutes. This was a publicity event for the Da Vinci Code film; the train carried actors Tom Hanks and Audrey Tautou, with director Ron Howard, who had jointly named the train The Da Vinci Code prior to departing for the film premiere at the Cannes Film Festival.

On 4 September 2007, the first revenue train to use High Speed 1 to St Pancras set a new speed record: it left Paris at 09:44 BST and arrived at St Pancras 2 hours 3 minutes and 39 seconds later. Officials aboard recorded speeds of up to 325 km/h (202 mph) in France and 314 km/h (195 mph) in Britain.

=== Exhibitions ===
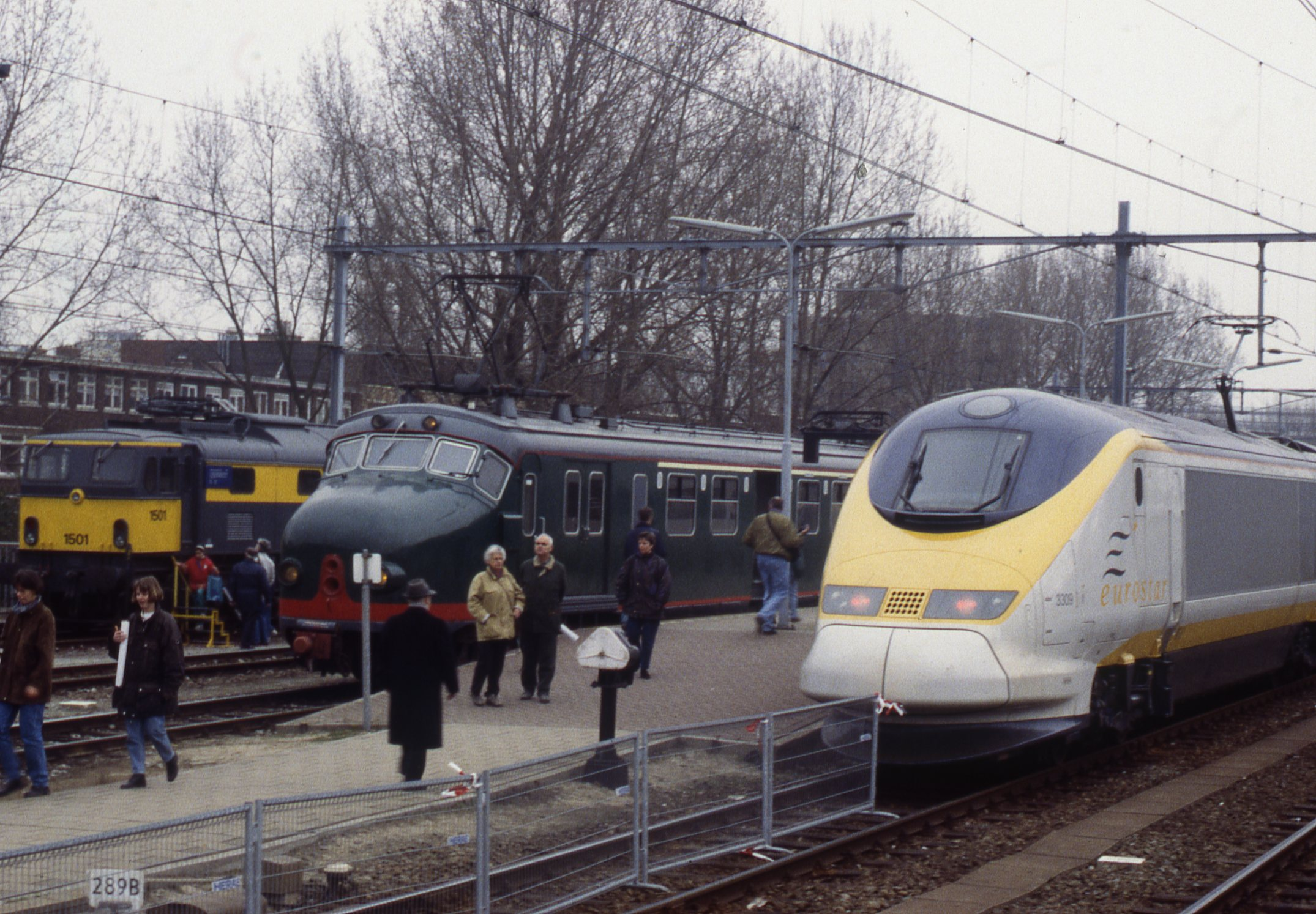
Class 373 alongside Mat '54 and NS Class 1500 at Rotterdam Centraal open day in 1996

On several occasions sets appeared at special events and displays, such as at Lille Flandres in 1995, (Note: Eurailspeed '95: half-set 3201) Rotterdam Centraal Station on 6 April 1996, (Note: Rotterdam CS open day: full-set 3309/3310) Berlin-Grunewald station for Eurailspeed 1998, Madrid Chamartín railway station for Eurailspeed 2002 and at the York National Railway Museum for the Railfest 200 celebrations in 2004. (Note: York Railfest 200: power car 3313 only)

To celebrate ten years of Eurostar service, a barge was floated down the River Thames in London on 16 November 2004, (Note: London floating installation: power car 3307 only) with a power car on board, specially painted by Ben Langlands and Nikki Bell. Named "Language of Places on Eurostar" by Langlands and Bell, it consisted of the three-letter "destination codes for all the places where Eurostar goes or connects". The barge went under Tower Bridge, past the Houses of Parliament and moored beside the museum-warship HMS Belfast.

At the beginning of August 2015, ex North of London powercar 373308 was added to the national collection and put on display at the National Railway Museum in York.

== Model railways ==
In 1995, Hornby Railways launched its first version of the Eurostar in HO gauge which can be extended from four to six cars. Hornby Railways then produced a OO gauge train pack model which was released in October 1996, which again can be extended from four cars to six cars. Hornby Railways released its first OO Gauge train set of the Class 373 in 1997.

Kato regularly produces N-scale Eurostar train sets. These consist of two sets: a main 8-car set and a 4-car extension set. Both liveries—the original and the current one—have been produced (10-1295/96 and 10-1297/98).

== Livery illustrations ==
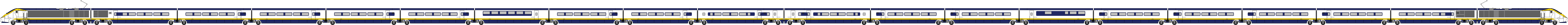
Three Capitals set in the original Eurostar livery
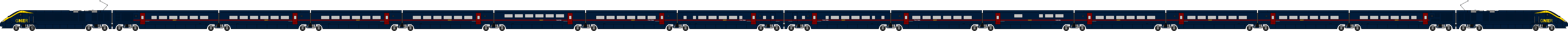
North of London set in GNER livery
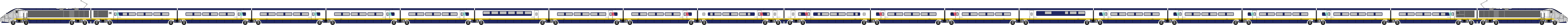
Three Capitals set in the original Eurostar livery with SNCF branding
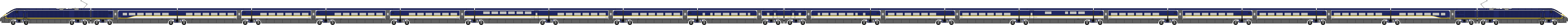
Three Capitals set in the new Eurostar e300 livery

== See also ==
- List of high-speed trains
