= IZY =

Low-cost European train service

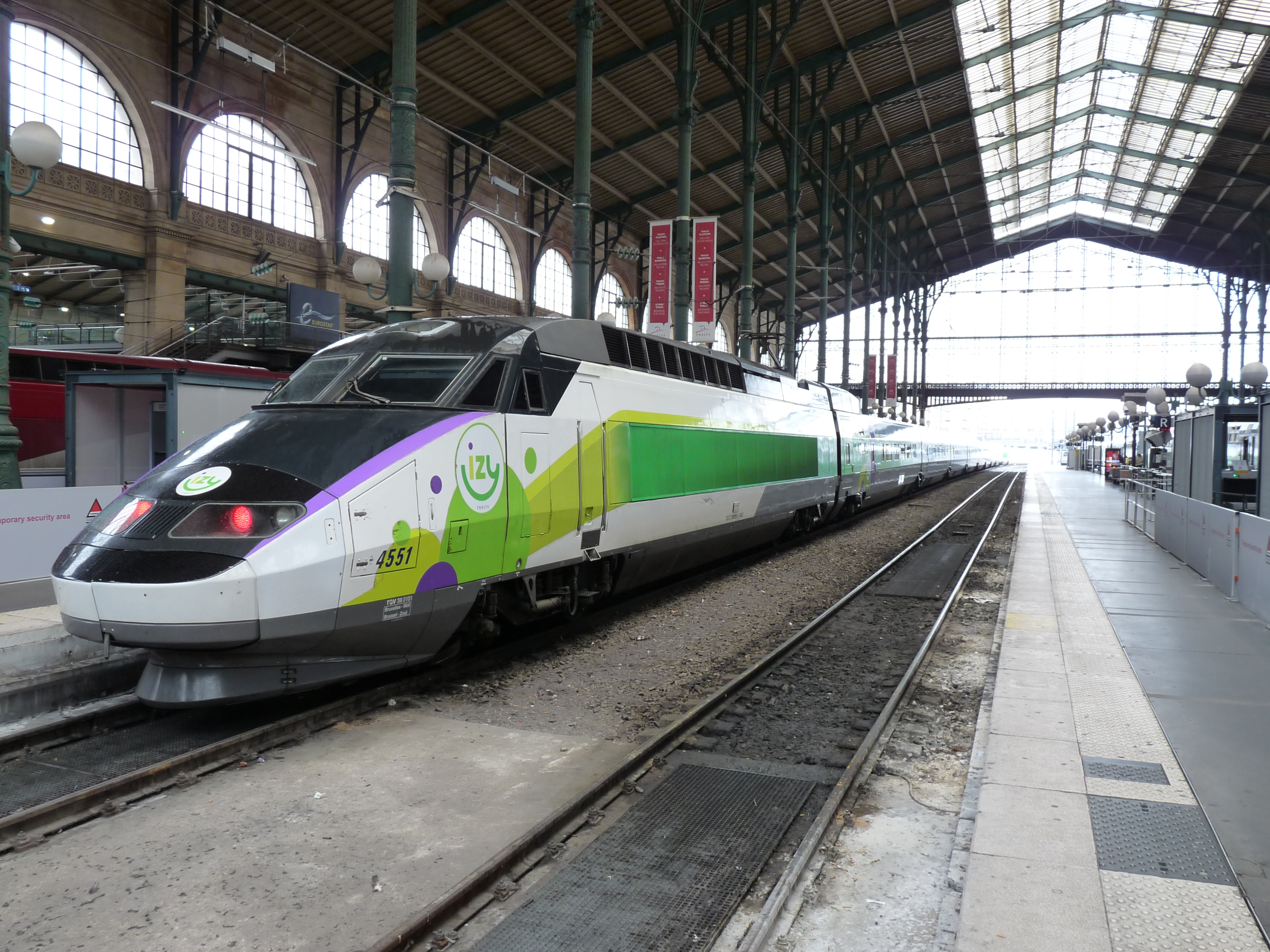
- An Izy train at Paris-Gare du Nord in March 2017

Overview
- Service type: Passenger train
- Status: Defunct
- Locale: France; Belgium
- First service: 3 April 2016
- Last service: 10 July 2022
- Current operator: Thalys
- Website: www.izy.com

Route
- Termini: Brussels-South; Paris-Gare du Nord
- Average journey time: 2 hours 30 minutes
- Service frequency: 4 per week
- Line used: Paris–Lille railway

Technical
- Rolling stock: TGV Réseau

Izy (French pronunciation: [iˈzi]) was a low-cost train service between Brussels and Paris. Services started on 3 April 2016, and ended on 10 July 2022.

== Background ==
Based on the Ouigo train service by SNCF, Thalys began its own low-cost service to compete with international coach services such as Eurolines and Megabus, and car pooling services such as BlaBlaCar. At its peak, Izy operated up to three services per day using two TGV high speed train sets leased from SNCF. Since 2020, Izy operated only four return trips between Friday and Monday.

== Concept ==
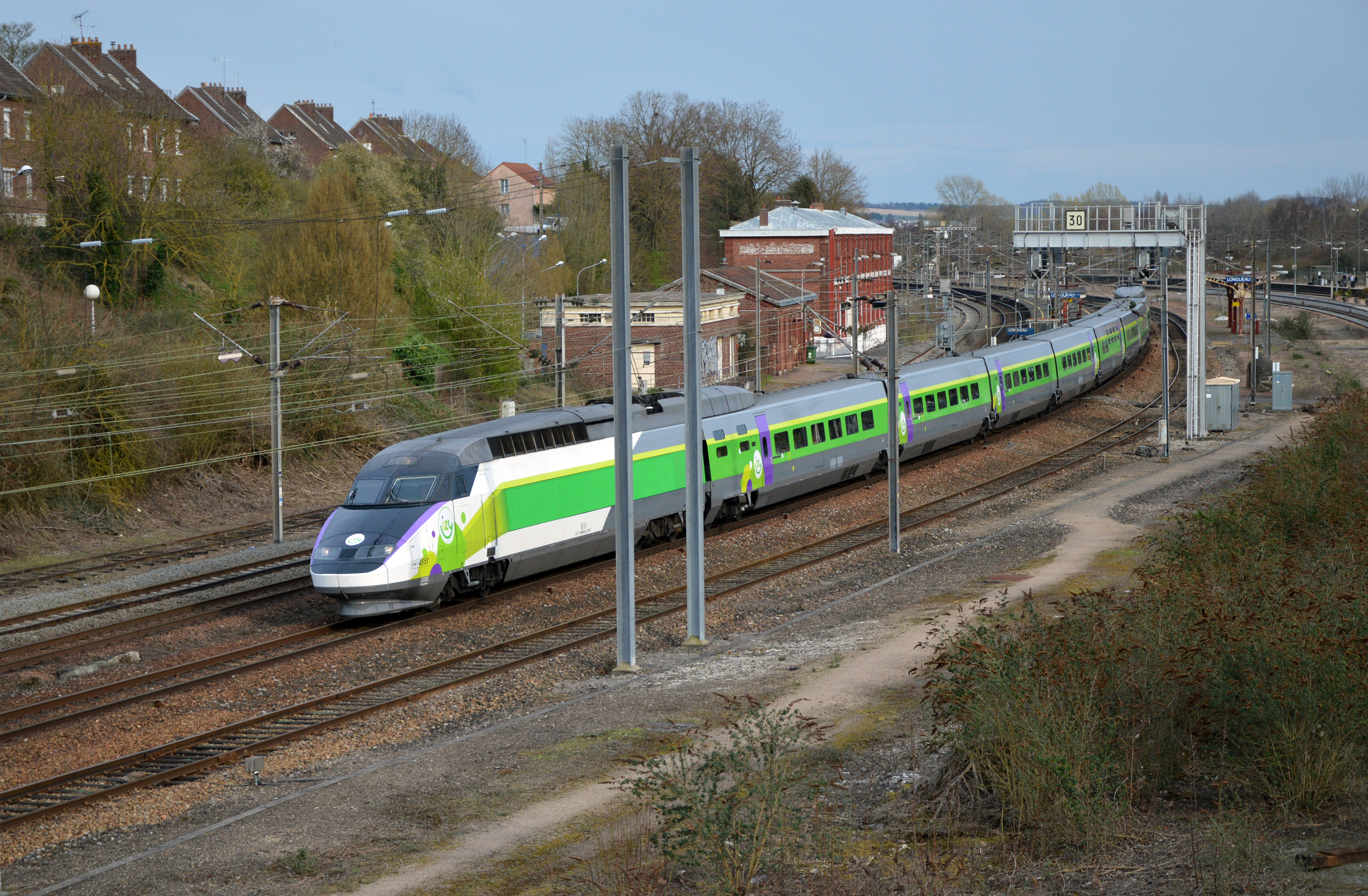
An Izy train in April 2016

The model of the service was based on low-cost airlines like Ryanair and EasyJet, having the following features:

- Tickets could only be bought on-line through a dedicated website izy.com or mobile app, not from ticket machines, ticket counters or through the regular Thalys website. Tickets had to be purchased at least four hours in advance of the journey and were either delivered by e-mail four days prior to travel, or via the mobile app as an e-ticket consisting of a QR code.
- Similar to some low-cost airlines, whilst two pieces of luggage (maximum size, cabin baggage at 35 cm×55 cm×25 cm, and hand luggage at 27 cm×36 cm×15 cm) were allowed free of charge, larger bags had to be paid for.
- The journey took between 2 hours 8 minutes and 2 hours 30 minutes, while the regular Thalys service takes 1 hour 22 minutes. This is due to the fact that IZY trains used the Paris–Lille railway between Paris and Arras, instead of the high-speed LGV Nord line, allowing Izy to pay lower track fees to SNCF.
- The trains carried fewer members of staff, who are tasked with basic maintenance of the train as well as serving passengers.
- Unlike on Thalys services there was no Wi-Fi and individual power sockets were only available on Standard XL seats.
- The only way to contact the company was via a webform. There was no customer service telephone number or e-mail address.

== Pricing ==
In order to offer significantly lower prices than on standard Thalys trains, Izy trains lacked a buffet car and had a greater number of more tightly packed seats. Standard adult fares started from €19 single depending on the time of the journey and how far it was booked in advance. A premium service named Standard XL started at €29 and offered a slightly larger seat and an individual power socket. There were also two lower costs options, a collapsible seat in the vestibule for as little as €15 and a non-guaranteed seat option for as little as €10. Thalys promised to charge no more than €59 for a ticket for Standard and €69 for Standard XL.

Supplementary fees were as follows:

- For children that are 10 or under, a flat fee of €10 was charged no matter the journey.
- Additional baggage (per piece) was €10 if booked at the time of booking, €20 on-line prior to travel, or €30 if purchased at the station immediately before travel.
- Pets could be taken on board; provided that they were in a carry case they travelled for free as part of the hand luggage. If not, a fee of €30 was charged per animal, or €15 if booked at the same time as the owner. Guide dogs were exempt from charges.
- An SMS information option for a supplementary fee of €2 per person.

== Rolling stock ==
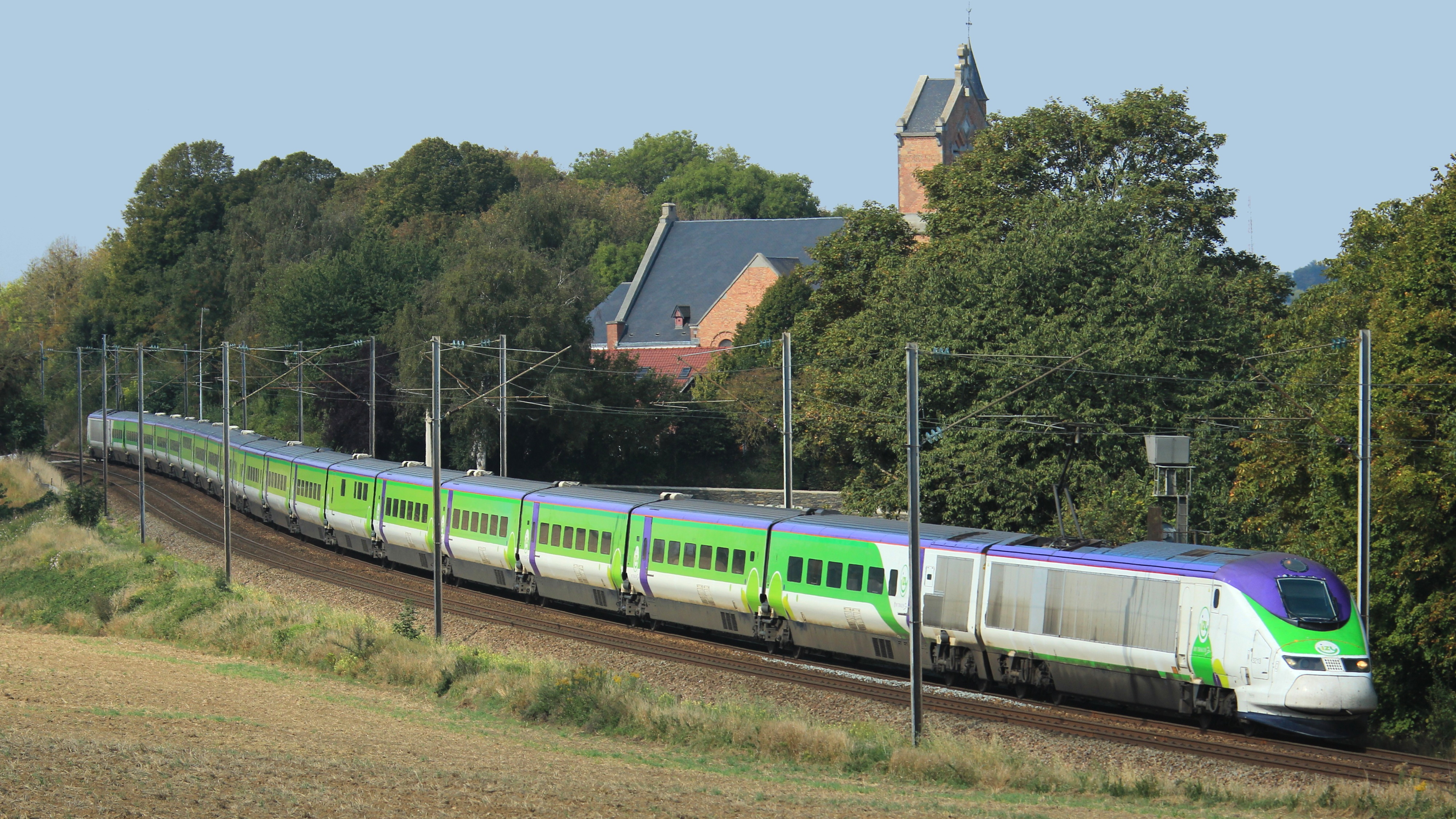
373213/373224 going through the commune of Feuchy, between the stations of Arras and Roeux in September 2020.

Izy used a dedicated TGV Réseau triple-voltage trainset, number 4551, painted in a silver, white and green IZY livery with purple doors.

In 2019, this was replaced by a former Eurostar Class 373/TGV TMST, formed with half-trainsets 373213 and 373224. The Izy livery on this set used white instead of silver paint and features more purple.

Since 2021, Izy trains were operated with conventional Thalys PBA/PBKA rolling stock.

== Stations ==
Izy used the main train stations of Brussels-South and Paris-Gare du Nord, in comparison to Ouigo, which serves secondary stations such as Marne-la-Vallée for Paris, and Tourcoing, which is near Lille. However, the Izy service did not use the same rail line as Thalys, but rather conventional older rail lines. For this reason it was more at risk of delays caused by other trains or factors on the rail system than the dedicated Thalys high speed line.
