= Thalys =

European high-speed train service, 1996–2023

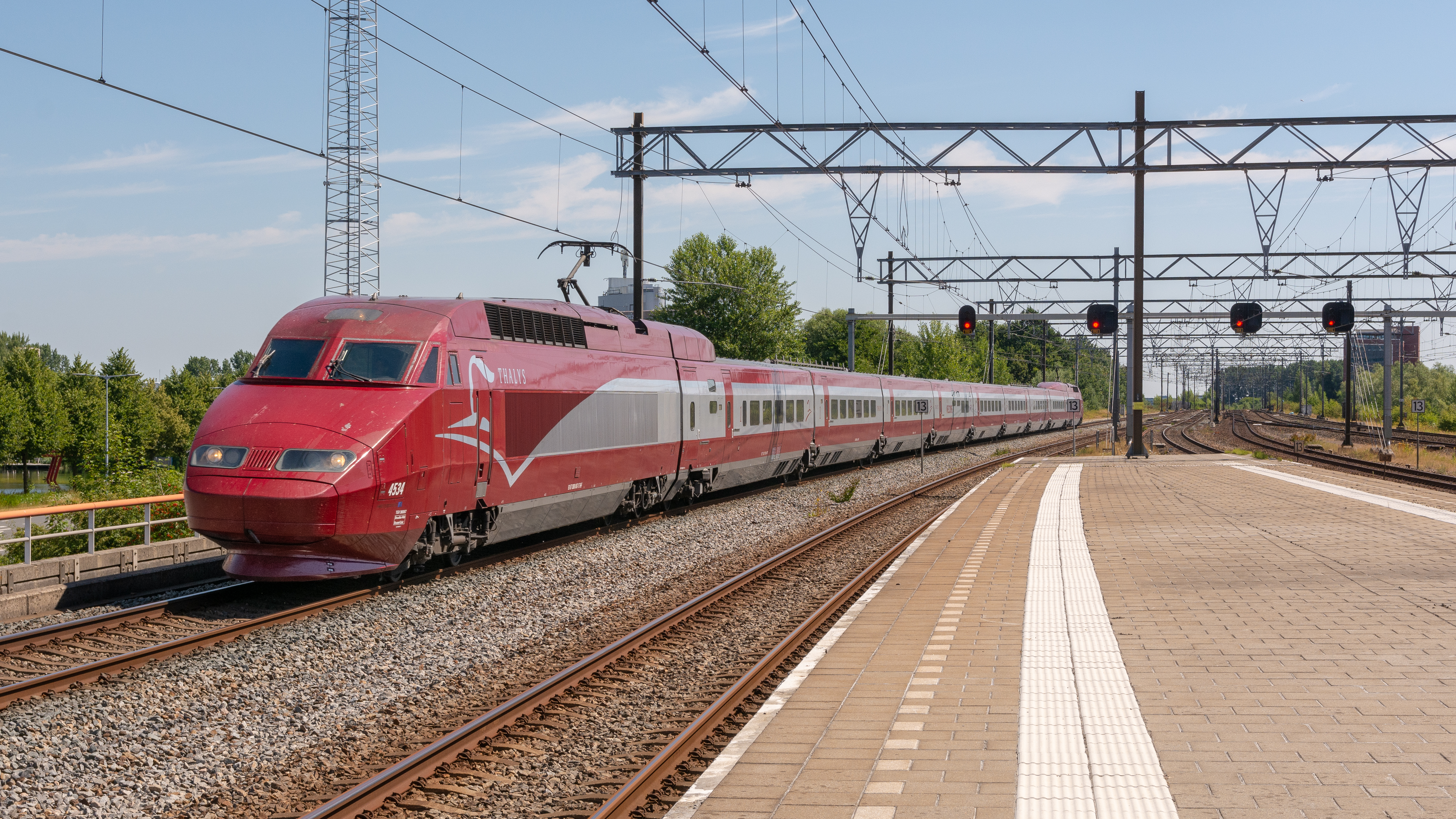
- Thalys TGV in Hoofddorp, Netherlands

Overview
- Owner: Eurostar Group
- Stations: 26
- Website: www.thalys.com

Service
- Type: High-speed rail
- Rolling stock: 9 Thalys PBA; 17 Thalys PBKA

History
- Commenced: 4 June 1996; 30 years ago
- Closed: 1 October 2023; 2 years ago

Technical
- Track gauge: 1,435 mm (4 ft 8 1/2 in) standard gauge
- Operating speed: 300 km/h (190 mph)

Thalys (French: [talis]) was a brand name used for high-speed train services between Paris Gare du Nord and both Amsterdam Centraal and German cities in the Rhein-Ruhr, including Aachen, Cologne, Düsseldorf, Duisburg, Essen and Dortmund, both via Brussels-South.

Thalys was created out of a political ambition formalised in October 1987 to establish a network of international high-speed railway services between the cities of Paris, Brussels, Cologne and Amsterdam. The Thalys name was created in January 1995. The company procured a fleet of Alstom-built TGV trains to operate its services as they were viewed as the only existing rolling stock suitable to the task.

On 4 June 1996, the first Thalys-branded train departed from Paris. Early services were more reliant on slower conventional lines as many of the intended new high-speed lines were still under construction. Service speeds improved with the opening of Belgium's HSL 1 line in December 1997 and the Dutch HSL-Zuid in December 2009, alongside other infrastructure works. Thalys's busiest route was the Paris–Belgium corridor; various airlines, such as Air France and KLM, opted to discontinue flights directly competing with Thalys's high speed services.

From 1996 to April 2022, the service was managed by Thalys International, which was 70% owned by the French national railway company SNCF and 30% owned by the Belgian national railway company NMBS/SNCB. It was operated by THI Factory, which was 60% owned by SNCF and 40% owned by NMBS/SNCB. Between 2007 and 2013, the German national railway company Deutsche Bahn had also held a 10% stake in the company.

On 30 March 2015, Thalys was restructured as a conventional train operating company, becoming less reliant on SNCF and NMBS/SNCB. During September 2019, a plan was announced to merge Thalys and the cross-Channel high-speed train operator Eurostar. Approval of the merger was issued by the European Commission on 28 March 2022. In February 2022, Thalys International was integrated into THI Factory, which in turn was acquired by the holding company Eurostar Group during the following month. From April 2022 to September 2023, Thalys services were operated by the Eurostar Group. Since 29 September 2023, the services operate under the Eurostar name; sometimes referred to as Eurostar Red, based on the colour of the trains.

== History ==
=== Background and establishment ===
Prior to the creation of Thalys, an express rail service had long been operating between the capital cities of Paris and Brussels, the earliest being run in 1924 in the form of the train service l'Étoile du Nord. By the 1970s, the conventional service connecting the two cities had a journey time of around two hours and 30 minutes. In the following decade, interest in an international high-speed train service along a similar route was gaining traction amongst various governments.

During October 1987, the political decision to create a network of high-speed services among the cities of Paris, Brussels, Cologne, and Amsterdam was made in Brussels. However, in 1991, the Dutch parliament initially rejected the project; continued discussions led to an agreement being reached with Belgium for a route via Breda instead of Roosendaal. The building of the HSL-Zuid high speed line in the Netherlands was finally approved in 1996. Meanwhile, Germany decided against the construction of a new railway between Aachen and Cologne, instead opting to renovate the existing track between Duren and Cologne, which resulted in a top speed of 250 kilometres per hour along this section. On 28 January 1993, SNCF, SNCB/NMBS, Nederlandse Spoorwegen and Deutsche Bundesbahn (which became part of Deutsche Bahn in 1994) signed an agreement to operate the axis on a joint basis.

During January 1995, Westrail International was created by the French and Belgian national railways to operate the new international services. That same month, both the logo and brand of Thalys were also created; the word deliberately lacked any particular meaning, save for being pronounceable in the languages of all the countries served. It was decided to procure Alstom-built TGV trains, similar to those already used by SNCF on the French national railways, as these were the only suitable rolling stock available at the time. Another key decision was to launch the service in advance of many of the planned high speed lines, being initially reliant upon slower conventional lines until these were eventually completed; the existing international services that used conventional rolling stock were deliberately withdrawn in preparation for the running of Thalys trains in early June 1996.

On 4 June 1996, the first Thalys-branded train departed Paris, this maiden journey took two hours and seven minutes to reach to Brussels, and four hours and 47 minutes to arrive in Amsterdam. Initially, Thalys services only operated four times per day to Amsterdam and Cologne, while a far greater volume were run between Paris and Belgium. While quite restricted early on, the number of Thalys services would be gradually expanded over time, as would the high speed network that supported it.

=== Changes and improvements ===
During December 1997, the Belgian HSL 1 line, allowing 300 km/h (186 mph) and running from the French border to the outskirts of Brussels, was inaugurated. On 14 December 1997, the first Thalys train from Paris to Brussels ran on the HSL 1, reducing travel time to 1:25 hours. At the same time, service commenced to Cologne and Aachen in Germany, and Bruges, Charleroi, Ghent, Mons, Namur and Ostend in Belgium. On 19 December 1998, the Thalys Neige service started to the ski resorts of Tarentaise Valley and Bourg-Saint-Maurice. In May 1999, the new high-speed line serving Charles de Gaulle Airport opened, and Thalys started direct services from Paris Charles de Gaulle Airport to Brussels, including codeshare agreements with Air France, American Airlines and Northwest Airlines. On 28 November 1999, Westrail International changed its name to Thalys International.

In 2000, Thalys started a daily service between Brussels and Geneva. With its Thalys Soleil (French for 'Thalys Sun'), it started offering direct connections to Provence, initially to Valence, and extended to Avignon and Marseille in 2002. Service between Brussels and Cologne was improved in December 2002 when trains began running on the new HSL 2 in Belgium. During 2003, Thalys services started to Brussels Airport and the Thalys Nuits d'Été service to Marne-la-Vallée. In 2007, Deutsche Bahn purchased a 10% shareholding, while SNCF reduced its stake to 62% and SNCB to 28%.

Beginning on 14 June 2009, the journey between Brussels and Cologne was shortened by 19 minutes when the new high-speed line HSL 3 between Liège and Aachen opened using Deutsche Bahn's thrice-daily ICE trains running between Brussels and Frankfurt. While HSL 3 was completed during 2007, Thalys trains had not been initially equipped with the European Train Control System (ETCS) signaling equipment necessary to use the new line. Following the completion of installation and testing work, Thalys began operating on HSL 3 on 13 December 2009. For the same reasons, Thalys started operating on the HSL 4/HSL-Zuid high-speed line between Antwerp and Amsterdam on 13 December 2009, two years after the line's construction.

Since 29 August 2011, one return journey to Cologne has been extended to Essen Hauptbahnhof, and since 30 October 2011, one return journey to Brussels had been extended to Brussels National Airport.

On 9 June 2013, Deutsche Bahn permanently ceased the sale of tickets for Thalys services, forcing affected travellers to purchase separate tickets. The company also opted to sell its 10 per cent shareholding in Thalys, marking a general parting of ways between the two operators.

Since the winter 2013 schedule, Thalys has operated services stopping at Düsseldorf Airport station. On 12 April 2014, it launched a regular service between Lille Europe and Amsterdam Centraal.

At the end of March 2015, Thalys dropped the Paris – Oostende and the Paris – Brussels – Mons – Charleroi – Namur – Liège routes; this withdrawal was reportedly due to a lack of funding from the Belgian government.

On 30 March 2015, Thalys was restructured as a conventional train operating company, adopting the name THI Factory, and has since operated under its own train operator certificate. Prior to this date, the ownership of Thalys's 26 multi-voltage TGVs had been divided between the four national railway operators holding stakes in the company; they were transferred to the company at this point. These changes were promoted as making Thalys a truly independent company, reducing its interactions with both SNCF and SNCB; headquarters were established in Brussels, with a branch office in Paris.

On 21 March 2016, services in Germany were extended to Dortmund.

In March 2018, Thalys ceased all its operations from Lille-Europe, citing disappointing demand (despite lower-than-average ticket prices) and financial results.

=== Merger with Eurostar ===
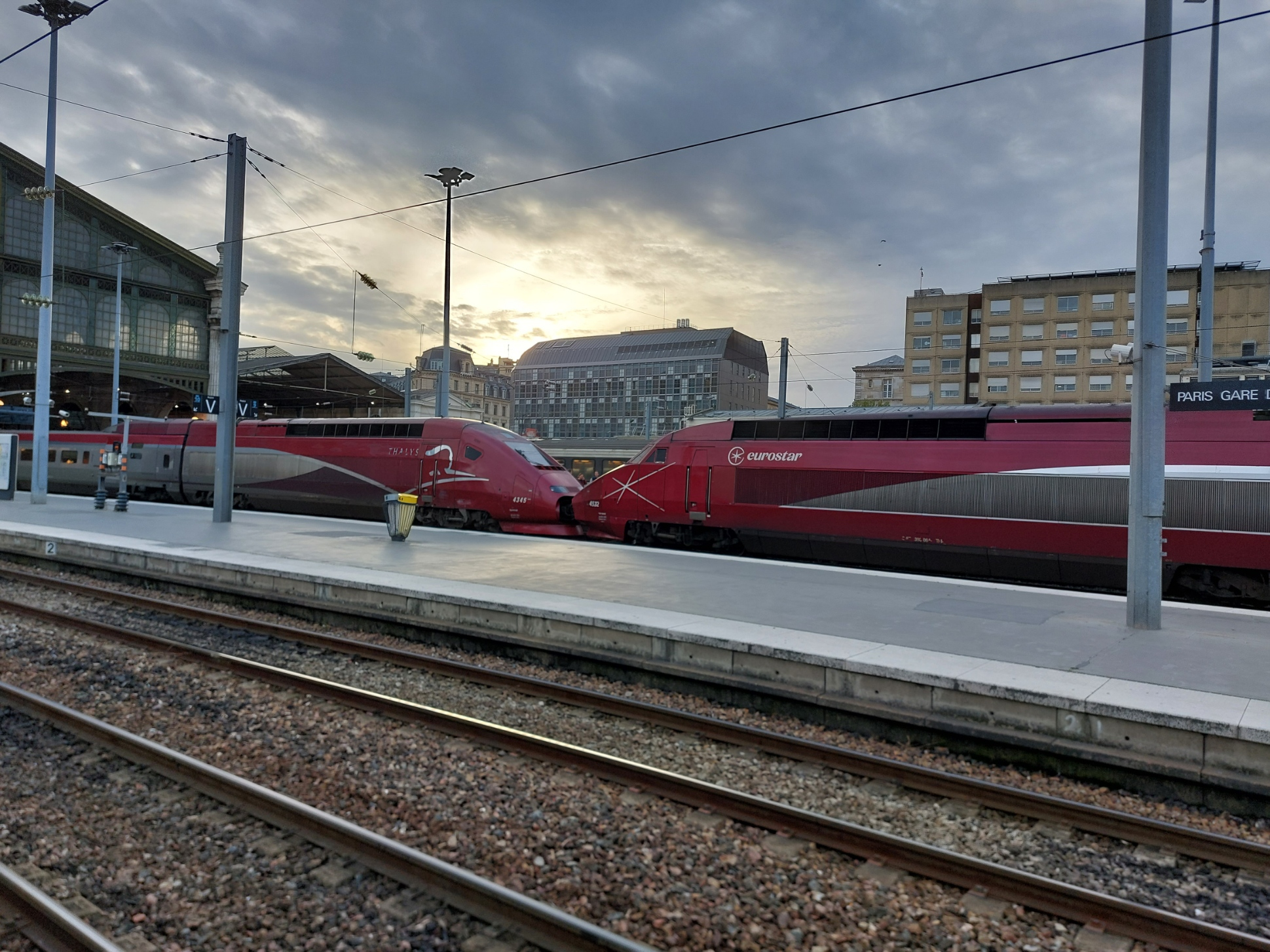
Two Eurostar (formerly Thalys) trains coupled in Paris-Nord station on 19 October 2023: one of them still wears the Thalys logo.

In September 2019, the shareholders of the cross-Channel high speed train operator Eurostar and Thalys introduced a plan to merge the two companies, named project Green Speed. Both companies already operate in France, Belgium, and the Netherlands, with Eurostar also operating in the United Kingdom, and Thalys also operating in Germany, while SNCF already held a majority stake in both operators. The project was promoted as reducing costs and providing a more seamless experience to passengers via the use of a single ticketing system and loyalty program.

During September 2020, the merger between Thalys and Eurostar International was confirmed, In October 2021, it was announced that, upon the completion of the merger, it was intended for all of Thalys's services to be rebranded as Eurostar. On 28 March 2022, the European Commission approved the merger. The rebranding of Thalys services commenced in the autumn of 2023, and was planned to be completed by early in 2024. All services of the Eurostar brand will carry a common Eurostar logo, but with the cross-channel trains retaining their dark blue livery, and Thalys's rolling stock retaining its deep red livery. In April 2022, THI Factory was acquired by a new holding company, Eurostar Group; its former shareholders received a corresponding stake in the new holding company.

The change of logo on the trains took time to complete; during a transition period, some PBA/PBKA trains with the new "Eurostar" logo could be seen together with others still wearing the older "Thalys" logo.

== Routes ==
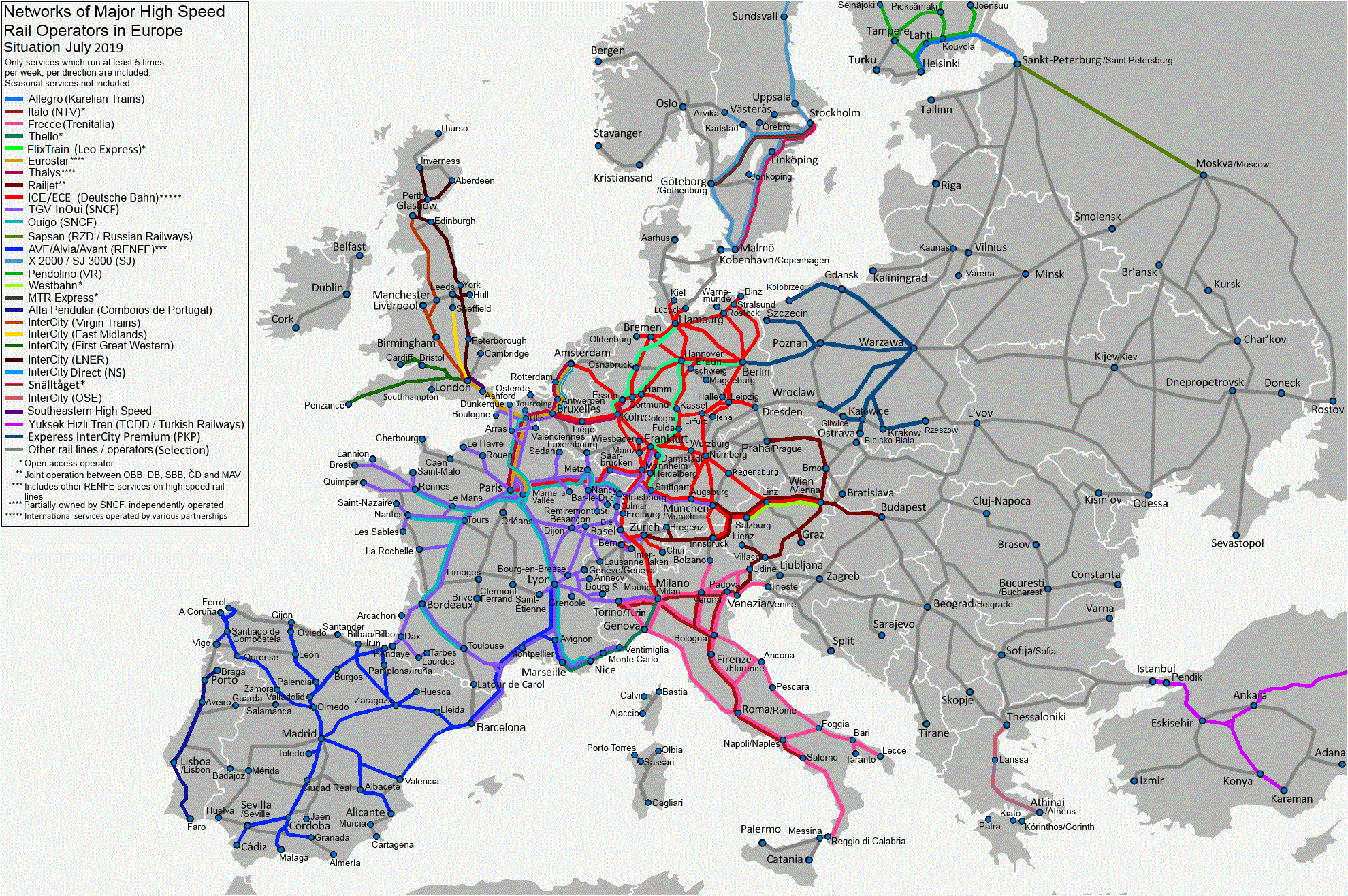
High-speed rail networks in Europe. Thalys line network shown in burgundy.

Beyond Brussels, the main cities Thalys trains reached were Antwerp, Rotterdam, Amsterdam, Liège, Aachen and Cologne. Trains to these destinations ran partly on dedicated high-speed tracks, and partly on conventional tracks shared with normal-speed trains. The high-speed lines formerly used by Thalys are HSL 1 between Paris and Brussels, HSL 4/HSL-Zuid between Antwerp and Amsterdam, and the HSL 2 and HSL 3 between Brussels and Aachen. For its seasonal operations within France, other high-speed lines were used.

Journeys from Brussels (Brussels-South) to Paris (Gare du Nord) were normally 1 hour and 22 minutes, for a distance of approximately 300 kilometres (190 mi). The peak service speed was 300 km/h (186 mph) while travelling a dedicated high-speed railway track, which is typically electrified at 25 kV AC by an overhead line.

The ligne à grande vitesse (LGV) link with Charles de Gaulle Airport allowed Air France to withdraw its air service between Paris and Brussels; instead, Air France transferred connecting passengers onto Thalys trains. Thalys had been given the IATA designator 2H. This is used in conjunction with American Airlines and Delta Air Lines. American Airlines had a code-sharing agreement with Thalys for rail service from Charles de Gaulle airport to Brussels-South. The airline alliance SkyTeam also had a code-sharing agreement with Thalys for rail service connecting its hub Amsterdam Schiphol Airport with Antwerp-Centraal and Bruxelles Midi/Brussel Zuid. Thalys and the Dutch flagcarrier KLM jointly collaborated on AirRail, an initiative to encourage passengers to travel by train to connect with KLM flights; this effort led to KLM reducing air services between Brussels and Amsterdam.

== Market ==
Thalys targeted a passenger market in France, Belgium, the Netherlands, and Germany.

The percentage of income coming from different routes demonstrated on which routes the company was most used:

- Paris-Brussels: 55.6%
- Paris-Belgium (outside Brussels): 8.9%
- Paris-Belgium-Netherlands: 21.3%
- Paris-Belgium-Germany: 11.8%
- Others: 2.4%

52% of customers were from the leisure market, while 48% were from the business market. A large segment of Thalys's total sales and income came from the connection between Paris and Brussels.

Unlike many national train companies, Thalys did not allow children below 12 years old to travel alone. Children onboard Thalys services had to be accompanied and possess appropriate travel documents as required by the relevant national authorities pertaining to the journey being made.

On 24 August 2010, a supplement of €7 was charged for Thalys's (and other international high-speed services') tickets bought at SNCB/NMBS ticket offices at train stations (but not on tickets bought over the Internet). This was to compensate for a reduction of the sales fee paid by Thalys and Eurostar to the Belgian rail company. The supplement increased over time and by June 2019 had risen to €9.

Thalys yearly passengers and revenue
	1996	1997	1998	1999	2000	2001	2002	2003	2004	2005	2006	2007	2008	2009	2010	2011	2012	2013	2014	2015	2016	2017	2018	2019	2020	2021	2022
Passengers			4.72	4.98	5.5	5.8	6.0	5.8	5.95	6.15	6.5	6.2	6.5	6.07	6.45	6.65	6.60	6.69		6.90	6.70	7.20	7.51	7.85	2.7	2.5	6.5
Revenue	60	115	190	220	266	294	310	301	318	335	363	364	392	382	432	470	479	487		487	457	509	527

All figures in millions. Revenue in millions of euros.

=== Accessibility ===
Thalys trains were wheelchair-accessible, with the assistance of the train staff. Bicycles were not allowed on Thalys unless disassembled or packed in a special wrap. Folding bikes were allowed.

In February 2020, Thalys announced that its new first-and-last mile travel service 'My Driver by Thalys's enabled passengers to choose between around 50 local taxi fleets to complete their rail journeys.

=== Thalys Lounge ===
Thalys operated station lounges in Brussels and Paris. Opened on 9 July 2015, the lounge in Paris' Gare du Nord, located on Rue de Dunkerque, offered travelers with a valid My Thalys World membership (Thalys's loyalty program) a variety of services, including free WiFi and a luggage storage service. For business travelers, a fully equipped meeting room was available for up to six people.

=== Partnership with Airlines ===
Prior to September 2023, Thalys had codeshare agreements with the following airlines:

- Brussels Airlines
- Delta Air Lines

Prior to September 2023, Thalys had Interline agreements with the following airlines:

- KLM

== Rolling stock ==
Thalys used two models of trains, both of which were part of the TGV (train à grande vitesse) family of high-speed trains built by Alstom in France.

Class	Image	Type	Top speed		Number	Built	Notes
Class	Image	Type	km/h	mph	Number	Built	Notes
PBA		Electric multiple unit	300	186	9	1996	Tri-current; Not equipped for Germany; operates only between Amsterdam, Brussels and various French destinations.
PBKA		Electric multiple unit	300	186	17	1997	Quadri-current; Can operate on all Thalys routes across France, Belgium, the Netherlands and Germany.

== Accidents and incidents ==
- On 9 May 1998, a truck was struck by a Thalys PBKA on an unprotected level crossing; it had attempted to cross the tracks at the crossing when the train arrived. The truck driver was killed in the impact and the train's power unit and first two passenger carriages derailed; the trainset was left heavily damaged. Six passengers were injured and the tracks and catenary were broken in the incident. Passenger carriages R1 and R2 had to be scrapped. The trainset was later repaired with the R1 and R2 carriages from a regular TGV trainset.
- On 11 October 2008, a Thalys PBA set bound for Amsterdam collided with a national ICM train set at Gouda railway station in the Netherlands. The Thalys train set had been diverted via Gouda due to engineering work on its usual route. None of the passengers were seriously injured, but both trains incurred serious damage. An investigation concluded that staff of the ICM train was to blame, as they left the station while still under a red signal.
- On 21 August 2015, a gunman attacked passengers on an Amsterdam–Paris train near Arras. The incident was treated as a terrorist attack. Three passengers along with the gunman received non-fatal injuries.

== See also ==
- Cologne–Aachen high-speed railway
- HSL 1
- HSL 2
- HSL 3
- HSL 4
- HSL-Zuid
- LGV Nord
- Train categories in Europe
- IZY – Thalys low-cost service
