= LGV Picardie =

Proposed French high-speed railway

The LGV Picardie is a proposed French high-speed rail line running between Paris and Calais, via Amiens, in Northern France.

When the LGV Nord was planned, the residents of the city of Amiens in the Picardy region campaigned for the line to run through Amiens. The SNCF decided instead to build the new high-speed line on a more direct route between Paris and Lille. The Picardy region is now served by the TGV Haute Picardie station, though this has been criticised for its lack of intermodal connections, summarised by the saying, la gare des betteraves ("station in a beetroot field").

The LGV Picardie would presumably deviate from the existing line north of the Gare du Nord and proceed directly to a new junction with the Calais branch of the LGV Nord to the east of Calais-Fréthun station. It is unclear how Amiens itself would be served, though the cheaper and more likely option would be to use existing infrastructure. Twenty minutes would be saved on the journey between Paris and Calais, thus making it possible to travel from London to Paris (Eurostar) in under two hours. An additional benefit would be to relieve congestion on the LGV Nord itself.

The French government has announced their SNIT future investment plans that are to be built by 2030, and for the first time the LGV Picardie is now included for implementation between 2020 and 2030, a project to cost €4.8bn, via either Amiens or Rouen.

However as of 2024, this line is not studied.

== See also ==
- LGV Interconnexion Est
- Roissy-Picardie Link
- LGV Nord
- HS1
