= LGV Sud-Est =

French high-speed railway

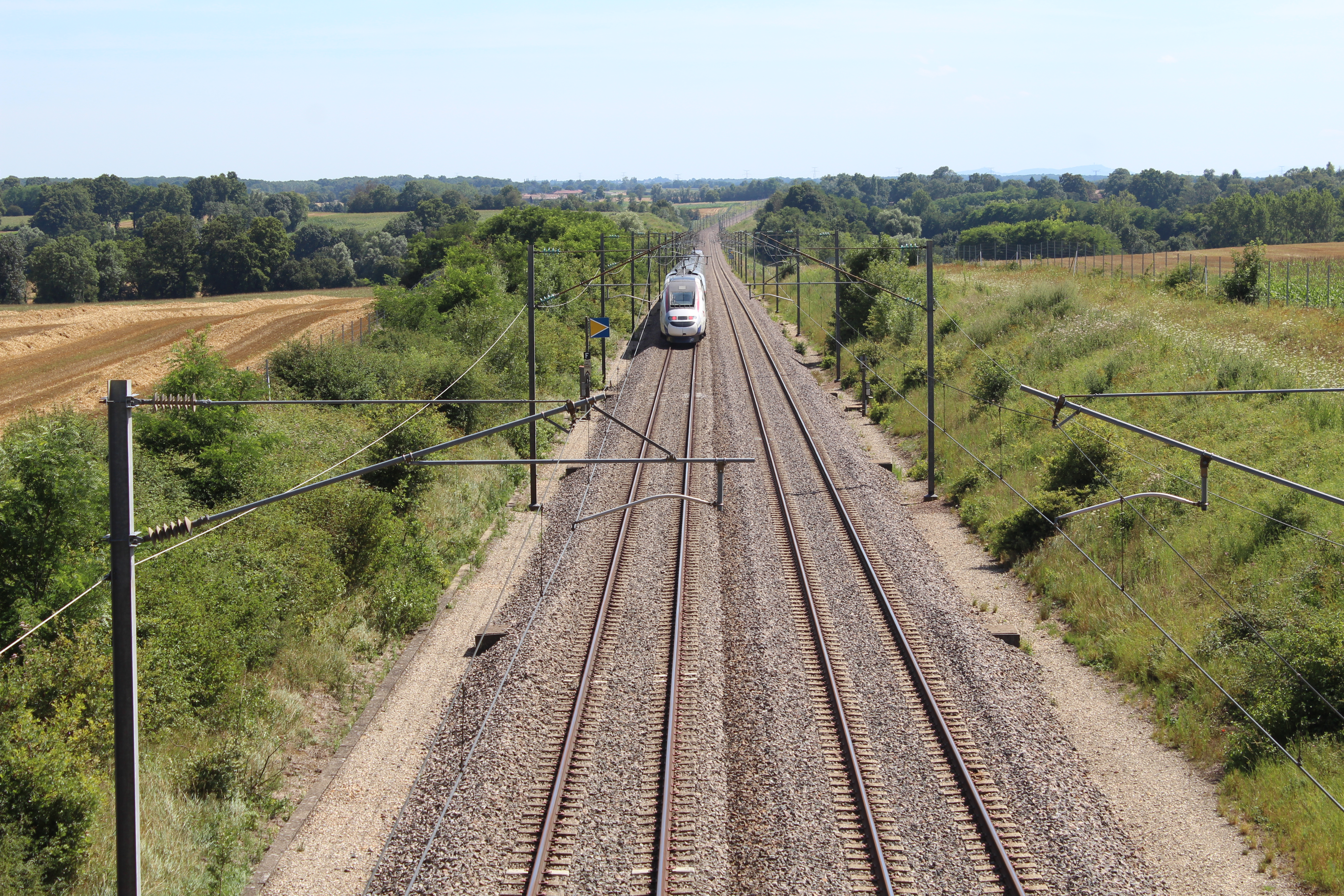
- The LGV Sud-Est in Cruzilles-lès-Mépillat

Overview
- Status: Operational
- Owner: SNCF (1981–1997); RFF (1997–2014); SNCF Réseau (2015–present)
- Locale: Île-de-France; Bourgogne-Franche-Comté; Auvergne-Rhône-Alpes
- Termini: Combs-la-Ville, Seine-et-Marne; Sathonay-Camp, Metropolis of Lyon

Service
- System: SNCF
- Operator: SNCF

History
- Opened: 22 September 1981: Saint-Florentin–Sathonay-Camp; 25 September 1983: Combs-la-Ville–Saint-Florentin

Technical
- Line length: 409 km (254 mi)
- Num of tracks: Double track
- Track gauge: 1,435 mm (4 ft 8 1/2 in) standard gauge
- Electrification: 25 kV 50 Hz
- Operating speed: 300 km/h (190 mph)
- Signalling: TVM-300 (current), ETCS Level 2 (future, in deployment)
- Maximum incline: 3.6%

The LGV Sud-Est (French: Ligne à Grande Vitesse Sud-Est; English: South East high-speed line) is a French high-speed rail line which connects the Paris and Lyon areas. It was France's first high-speed rail line, it has also been the most widely used line in France as well as being the busiest high-speed line in Europe.

Construction of LGV Sud-Est commenced in 1976, although development of the associated technologies had been underway for over a decade prior. Several key decisions, such as the use of overhead electrification instead of gas turbines, were influenced by geopolitical events as much as by innovations. On 22 September 1981, the inauguration of the first section between Saint-Florentin and Sathonay-Camp was attended by President François Mitterrand. It marked the beginning of the re-invigoration of French passenger rail service; ten million passengers travelled on the LGV Sud-Est within its first ten months of operation while domestic flights between Paris and Lyon declined substantially due to the effectiveness of TGV services.

The high rate of return generated by LGV Sud-Est quickly motivated the construction of other LGVs. Several of these have extended the reach of the high-speed trains that use LGV Sud-Est, such as the LGV Rhône-Alpes and LGV Méditerranée to the south and the LGV Interconnexion Est to the north; these connecting lines shortened journey times between Paris and the southeast of France (Marseille, Montpellier and Nice), Switzerland and Italy, as well as between the southeast and the north and west of France, the United Kingdom and Belgium.

== History ==
Following the creation of SNCF's research department in 1966, one of its primary endeavours was code-named "C03: Railways possibilities on new infrastructure (tracks)". In 1971, the "C03" project, which had been also garnered the name "TGV Sud-Est", was validated by the French government. Following the 1973 oil crisis, which had substantially increased oil prices, it was decided to favour electric traction over gas turbine propulsion; as a consequence, high-speed pantographs and overhead electrification was developed for use on what would become LGV Sud-Est.

During 1976, construction of infrastructure for LGV Sud-Est commenced. One year later, the SNCF placed its initial production order with the rolling stock manufacturing group Alstom–Francorail–MTE for 87 TGV Sud-Est trainsets that would later run on the line.

On 27 September 1981, LGV Sud-Est was opened to the public. It was an instant success, ten million passengers were recorded as travelling on the line within its first ten months. As a result, domestic flights between Paris and Lyon declined substantially as the travelling public switched to using the TGV instead.

By 2020, LGV Sud-Est was still reportedly the most widely used line in France as well as being the busiest high-speed line in Europe. The line carried a third of all railway traffic in France, including up to 300 TGVs per day, and carried 52 million passengers through 2019.

=== Timeline ===
- 10 July 1967: SNCF's research division launches project C03 on high-speed rail, titled "Rail Transport Possibilities through New Infrastructure"
- 26 March 1971: new line project approved by inter-ministerial committee
- 23 March 1976: declaration of public utility signed by Prime Minister Jacques Chirac
- 7 December 1976: works commence at Écuisses, Saône-et-Loire
- 14 June 1979: first rails laid near Montchanin, Saône-et-Loire
- 20 November 1980: track laying ends in Cluny, Saône-et-Loire
- 26 February 1981: trainset no. 16 (SNCF TGV Sud-Est) breaks the world record for rail speed at 380 km/h between Courcelles-Frémoy, Côte-d'Or and Dyé, Yonne in a gradually descending portion of the line
- 22 September 1981: inauguration of the first section (Saint-Florentin to Montchanin) by the President of the Republic, François Mitterrand
- 27 September 1981: commercial service begins
- 25 September 1983: service begins on the northern section (Combs-la-Ville to Saint-Florentin)
- 31 August 1992: derailment at 270 km/h of a TGV in Macon-Loché station; several passengers waiting on the platform are slightly injured by flying ballast
- 13 December 1992: service begins on northern section of LGV Rhône-Alpes (Montanay to Saint-Quentin-Fallavier)
- 26 May 1994: service begins on LGV Interconnexion Est (connection with LGV Nord)
- March 1996: beginning of line renovation works (replacement of ballast and points, works designed to last until 2006)
- 2 June 1996: service begins at the junction with Villeneuve-Saint-Georges by the Coubert triangle

== Route ==
The line crosses six departments, from north to south:

- Seine-et-Marne
- Yonne
- Côte-d'Or
- Saône-et-Loire
- Ain
- Rhône

The TGV system is compatible with the regular rail network, avoiding the need for new infrastructure construction to reach existing train stations in the dense urban areas of Paris and Lyon.

The distance from Paris (Gare de Lyon) to Lyon (Part-Dieu) is 425 km (264 mi). The LGV route is 409 km (254 mi) long; by avoiding built-up areas between Paris and Lyon (particularly Dijon) this enables a route 87 km (54 mi) shorter than the regular line, which is 512 km (318 mi) long. The route length was further shortened by using higher grades (up to 3.5%, compared to a maximum of 0.8% on the previous line) which allowed the line to follow a direct route rather than deviating to avoid hills. There are no tunnels.

The line includes various connectors to the regular rail network:

- at Pasilly-Aisy towards Dijon, and further through the Jura Mountains to Vallorbe and Lausanne or Neuchâtel and Zurich
- at Mâcon-Pont-de-Veyle towards Bourg-en-Bresse and the Savoie department
- at Saint-Florentin
- at Le Creusot station
- at Mâcon-Loché station

These last three are used by service trains or in order to divert passenger trains if needed.

The line runs next to the A5 autoroute for 60 km (37 mi) and the N79 road for 15 km (9.3 mi). For its full length, a 5 m (16 ft)-wide area has been reserved for a telecommunication artery.

== Line specifics ==
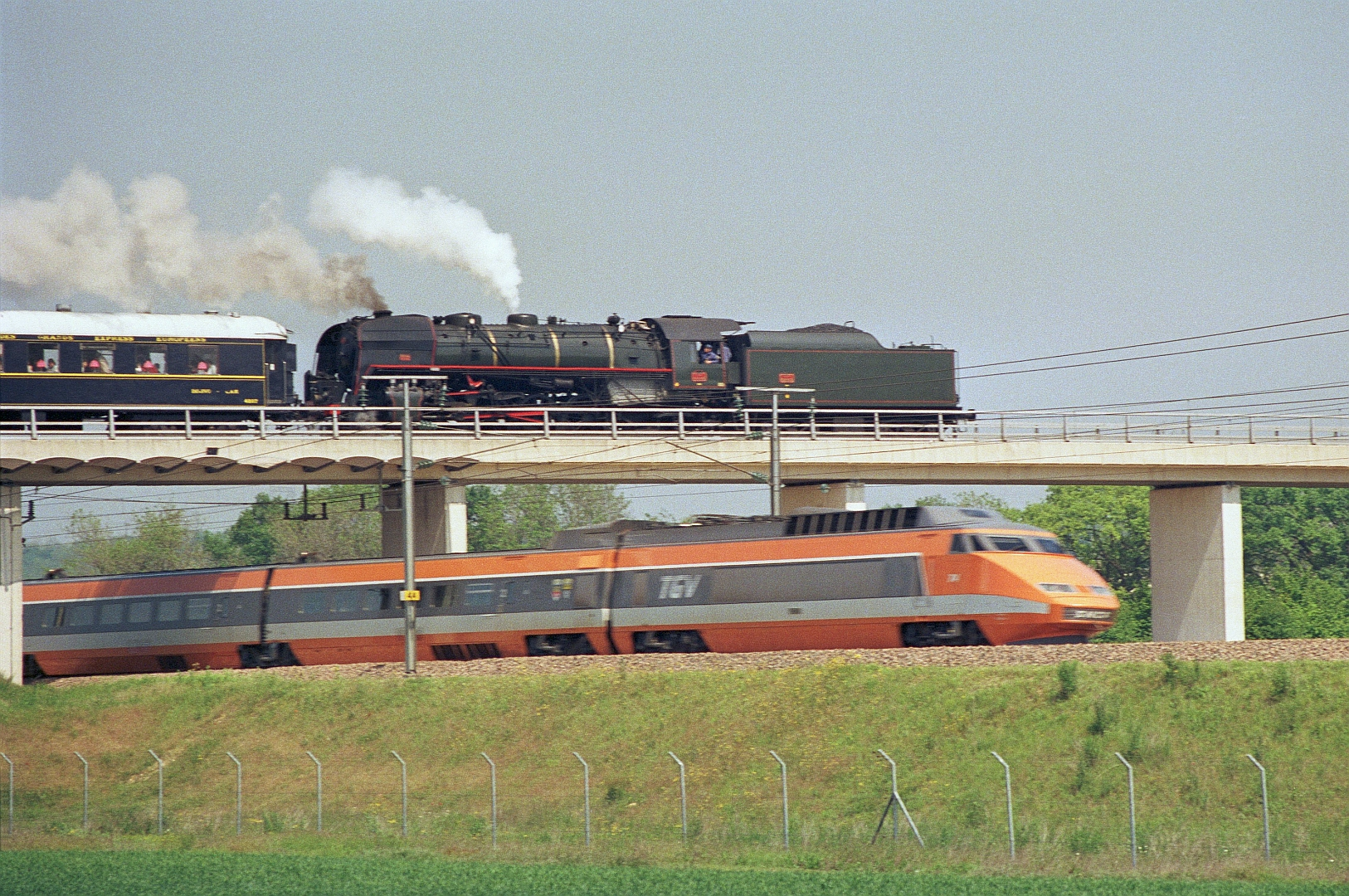
A TGV running on the line on 24 May 1987, in Saint-Germain-Laval, Seine-et-Marne

The line has a surface area of 16 km^{2} (6.2 sq mi) – in comparison Charles de Gaulle Airport occupies 32 km^{2} (12 sq mi) – with an average width of 40 m (130 ft). Platforms are 13 m (43 ft) wide, with a space between track centres of 4.2 m (14 ft). The line was designed for a nominal speed of 300 km/h (190 mph), with a minimum radius curve of 4,000 m (13,100 ft) – although seven curves were made to a smaller radius, but no less than 3,200 m or 10,500 ft.

In total, the line comprises 847 km (526 mi) of track. This is formed by UIC 60 (60.3 kg/m [40.5 lb/ft]) rails placed in 288 m (945 ft) lengths, welded in place (with certain segmented sections). The 2.41 m (7 ft 11 in) concrete sleepers are formed of two blocks of concrete tied together by a metal strut. There are 1660 sleepers per kilometre.

Traction power is supplied by eight EDF substations at 25 kV AC, 50 Hz. The catenary is fed by an inverted phase "feeder" cable, which is equivalent to a 50 kV supply and reinforces the available power, enabling a single trainset to draw up to 14 MW.

Signalling relies on high-frequency track circuits that transmits signals directly to the driver's console, known as Transmission Voie-Machine (TVM). Drivers are unable to accurately identify traditional track-side railway signals. While there are lineside marker boards indicating the limits of each block section, there no traditional signals as such. The TVM system is set to be replaced by the newer European Rail Traffic Management System (ERTMS).

The highest point on the line is 489 m (1,604 ft) above sea level, near the town of Liernais, 55.5 km (34.5 mi) north of Gare du Creusot. This is near the range dividing the Seine and Loire river valleys, and not far from the Rhône river valley.

== Stations ==
The LGV Sud-Est serves the following stations:

- Le Creusot
- Mâcon-Loché
- Lyon Part-Dieu

Le-Creusot and Mâcon-Loché are basic stations situated away from built-up areas. They have four tracks, with the two central tracks being reserved for through trains, and the side tracks serving stopping trains on two side platforms.

== Costs ==
Item	Cost, nominal (in 1984 francs)	Cost, real (in 2025 euros)
Construction of superstructure and infrastructure	7.85 billion	(2.65) billion
Construction of superstructure and infrastructure, with land purchase	8.5 billion	(2.86) billion
Rolling stock	5.3 billion	(1.79) billion
Total	13.8 billion	(4.65) billion

LGV Sud-Est, akin to other early French high-speed lines, was financed mainly by debt held by SNCF. The decision to proceed with these early LGVs, and the order in which they were constructed, was heavily influenced by evaluations of their profitability, not only in pure financial terms but also the estimated social benefits. Expectations for LGV Sud Est had included a minimum 12 percent financial rate of return; this was exceeded as a result of the line's high rate of usage, both in terms of traffic and revenue generation. The achieved financial rates of return, which have been estimated to have been between 15 percent and 30 percent per year in socioeconomic terms, permitted the LGV to be fully amortised by the end of 1993 after 12 years of operational use; unlike several of France's later LGVs, no subsidies were used. The financial success of LGV Sud Est encouraged the French government commit further large financial contributions towards the construction of additional high-speed lines.

During the mid-to-late 1990s, the track of the LGV Sud-Est was renewed at a cost of FRF 2 billion, or about €300 million. Maintenance and renewal work is typically performed at night wherever possible to impact a minimal amount of traffic. Between 2020 and 2023, a comprehensive modernisation of the line was performed at a cost of 300 million euros; it was part of a wider programme of works aimed at increasing both traffic and regularity on key parts of France's LGV network.

== See also ==
- TGV
