= Roissy–Picardie Link =

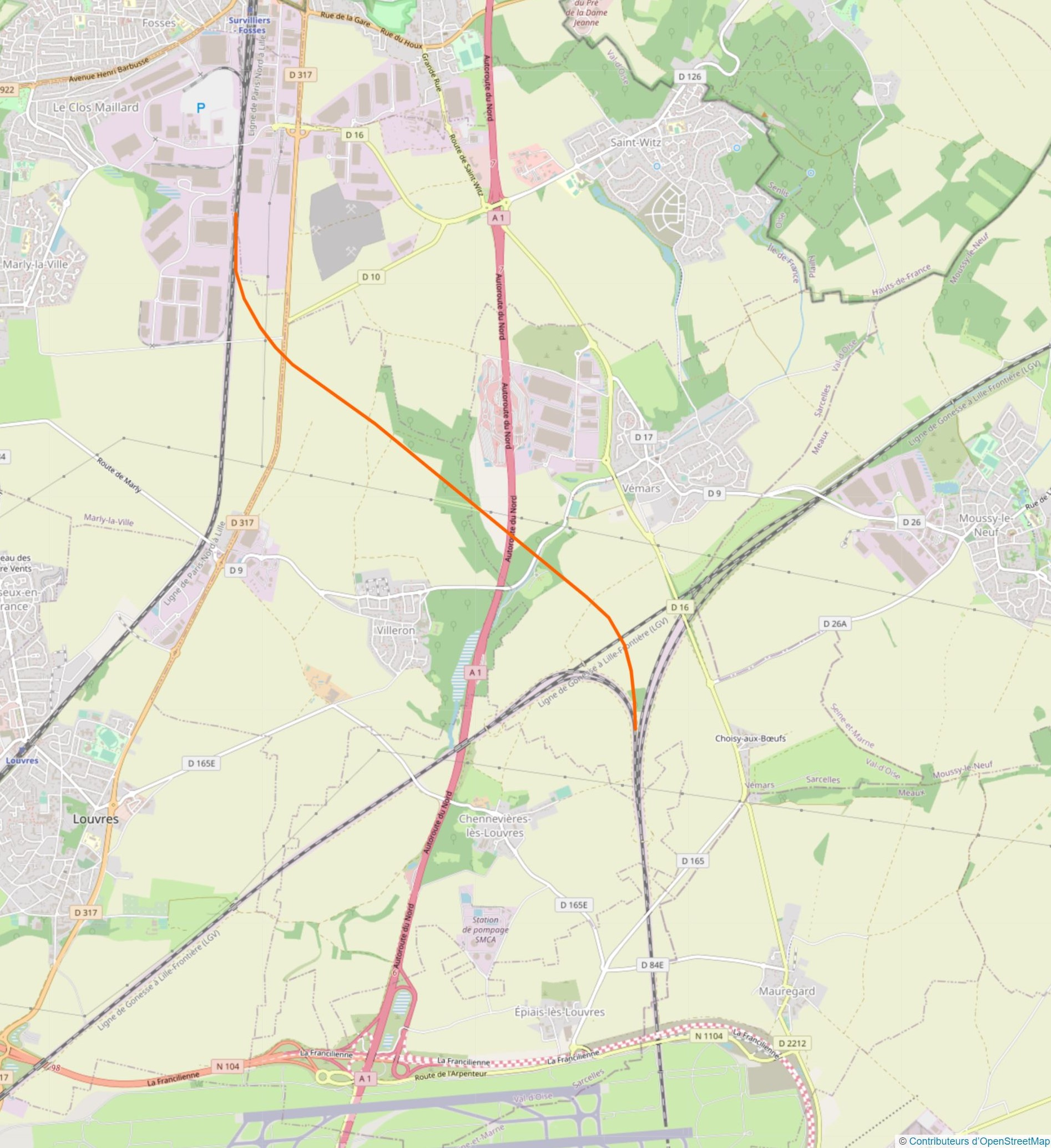
- Map of the line

Overview
- Status: Under construction
- Owner: SNCF Réseau
- Locale: Île-de-France; France
- Termini: Aéroport Charles de Gaulle 2 TGV; Survilliers - Fosses

Service
- System: SNCF
- Operator(s): SNCF

History
- Planned opening: 2026

Technical
- Line length: 6.5 km (4.0 mi)
- Number of tracks: Double track
- Track gauge: 1,435 mm (4 ft 8 1/2 in) standard gauge
- Electrification: 25 kV AC 50 HZ OHLE
- Operating speed: 160 km/h (99 mph)
- Signalling: TVM 430; ETCS Level 2

The Roissy–Picardie Link is a future railway line near Paris. Construction started in February 2025, with opening planned for 2026.

== Route ==
The Roissy–Picardie Link will link the LGV Interconnexion Est, at Aéroport Charles de Gaulle 2 TGV station, to Survilliers-Fosses station on a regional railway line heading north towards Creil. This would allow direct rail connections between Charles de Gaulle Airport and towns to the north. The link will be 6.5 km (4.0 mi) long, electrified, and with a speed limit of 160 km/h (99 mph). Construction will include upgrades to Survilliers-Fosses station and the building of a new platform at Aéroport Charles de Gaulle 2 TGV.

The link will be used by a twice-daily TGV to Amiens stopping at Creil (one from Marseille and one from Strasbourg) as well as 3 daily regional trains (TER) on the same route. The new 17 daily TER connection to Compiègne via Creil are also planned. The new line will cut around 40 mins on all of these trips.

Around 4 million daily passengers are expected, of which 2/3 would be everyday travelers. It is estimated that the new line will lead to 100,000 car trips to the airport instead being done by train every year, saving around 517, 000 tonnes of CO_{2} over 40 years.

== Project ==
A public enquiry was started in 2010, with the line to enter service in 2020. In 2016, it was announced that opening would be delayed to 2024 or even 2030. In 2017, a financing agreement was reached between the state, the region, and local authorities. The déclaration d'utilité publique was obtained in 2022. As of 2025, work is well underway, with mid-2026 targeted for the end of construction, and 2027 for the first passenger trips.

== See also ==
- LGV Picardie
- LGV Nord
