= La Borne Blanche station =

Railway station in Orry-la-Ville, France

Coordinates: 49.1266°N 2.5064°E

La Borne Blanche
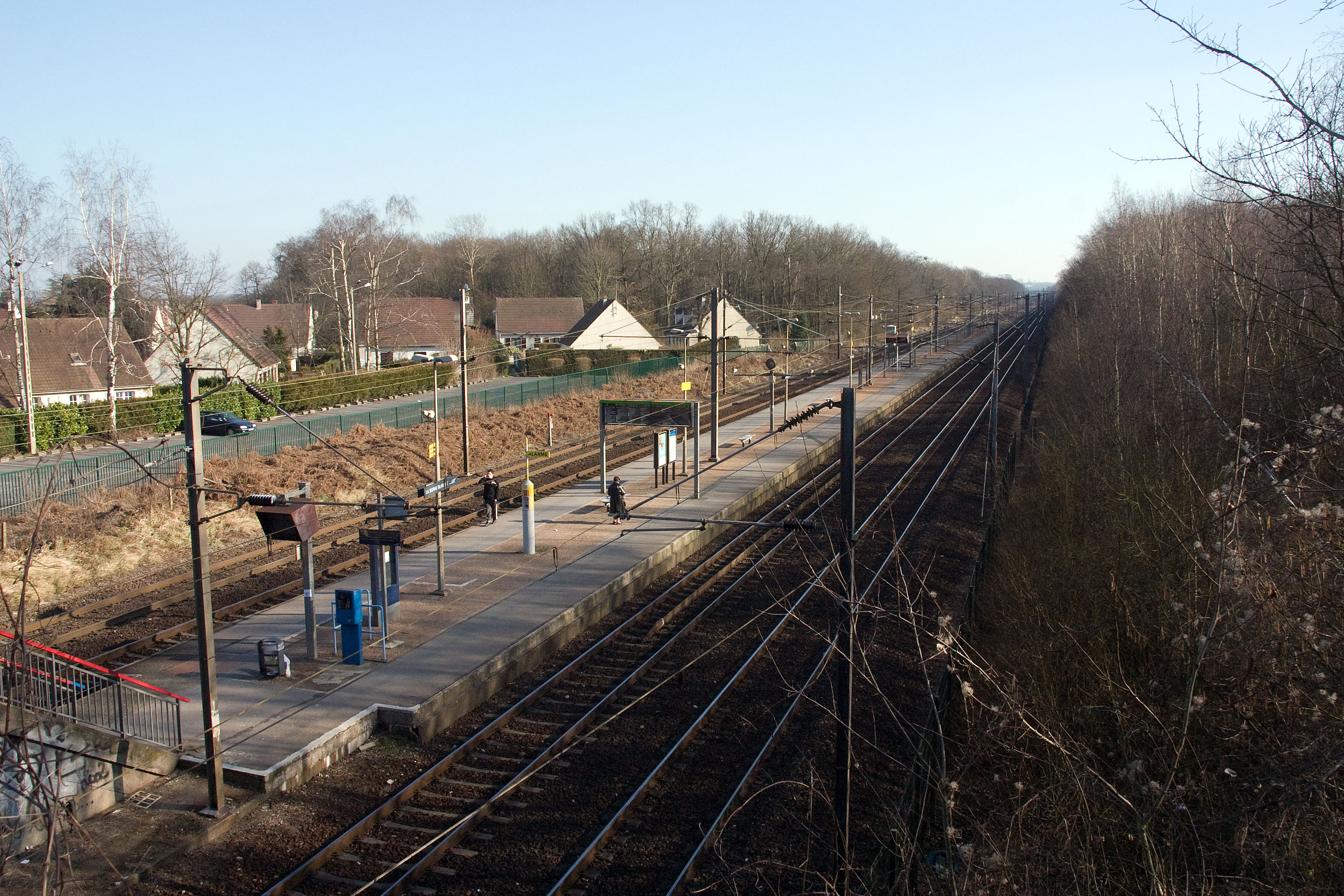

General information
- Owner: SNCF
- Operator: SNCF
- Line: RER D
- Platforms: 1 island platform
- Tracks: 4

History
- Opened: 6 December 1964

Services
Preceding station	RER	Following station
Orry-la-Ville–Coye towards Creil	RER D	Survilliers-Fosses via Ris-Orangis towards Corbeil-Essonnes
Orry-la-Ville–Coye Terminus	RER D	Survilliers-Fosses via Ris-Orangis towards Corbeil-Essonnes
Location

La Borne Blanche (French pronunciation: [la bɔʁn blɑ̃ʃ]) is a French railway station on the Paris–Lille railway, situated in the commune of Orry-la-Ville, in Oise, in the Hauts-de-France region. It is situated at a distance of 850 m (2,790 ft) from the centre of Orry-la-Ville and 2 km (1.2 mi) from Orry-la-Ville–Coye station. The station is on the borders of the Chantilly Forest.

It is considered a railway halt by the SNCF, served by Île-de-France's RER D; despite being in Hauts-de-France it is not served by TER Hauts-de-France trains.

== Situation ==
The station is established at an altitude of 95 m (312 ft) above mean sea-level, at the kilometric point n°33,180 of the Paris-Lille railway, between the stations of Survilliers-Fosses and Orry-la-Ville–Coye.

== See also ==
- List of Réseau Express Régional stations
