= Survilliers-Fosses station =

Railway station in Fosses, France

Survilliers-Fosses
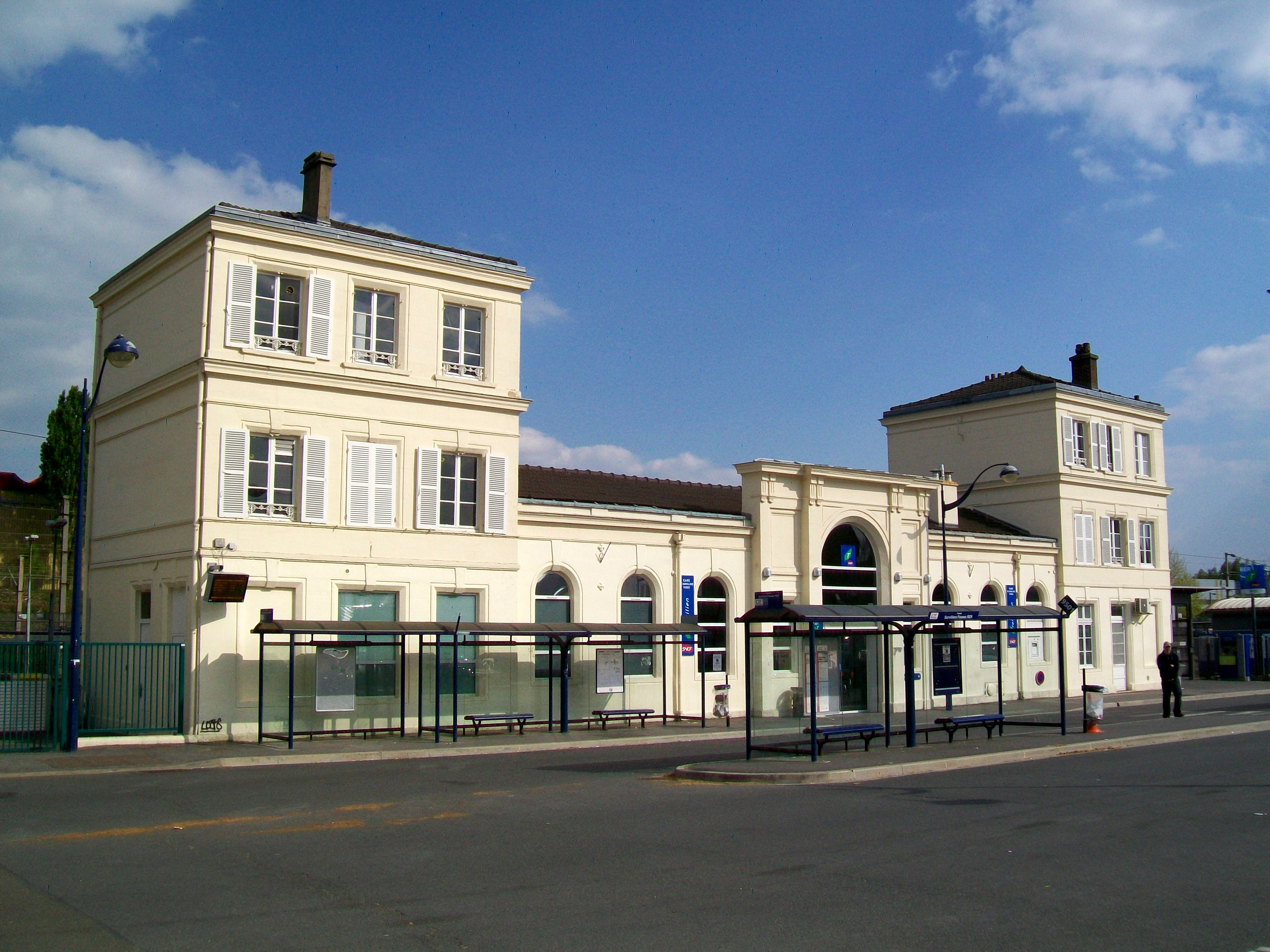

General information
- Location: Place Jean-Moulin; 95470 Fosses; Val-d'Oise; France
- Coordinates: 49°05′58″N 2°31′33″E
- Elevation: 114 m (374 ft)
- Owner: SNCF
- Operator: SNCF
- Line: RER D
- Platforms: 2 side platforms
- Tracks: 2

Construction
- Architect: Lejeune

History
- Opened: June 1859

Passengers
- 2024: 2,473,723

Services
Preceding station	RER	Following station
La Borne Blanche towards Creil	RER D	Louvres via Ris-Orangis towards Corbeil-Essonnes
La Borne Blanche towards Orry-la-Ville–Coye	RER D	Louvres via Ris-Orangis towards Corbeil-Essonnes
Location

The Survilliers-Fosses station is a French railway station on the Paris–Lille railway line, situated in the commune of Fosses close to Survilliers, in the Val-d'Oise department, in the Île-de-France region.

It is served by the RER D, and is the last stop within Île-de-France, with a separate tarification applying for stops to the North.

In the future, the station will also be served by trains towards Aéroport Charles de Gaulle 2 TGV station using the new Roissy–Picardie Link, which started construction in 2024 and is planned to open in 2026. The new line will join the main line at Survilliers-Fosses station.

== See also ==
- List of RER stations
