= Matt Moussilou =

Congolese-French footballer (born 1982)

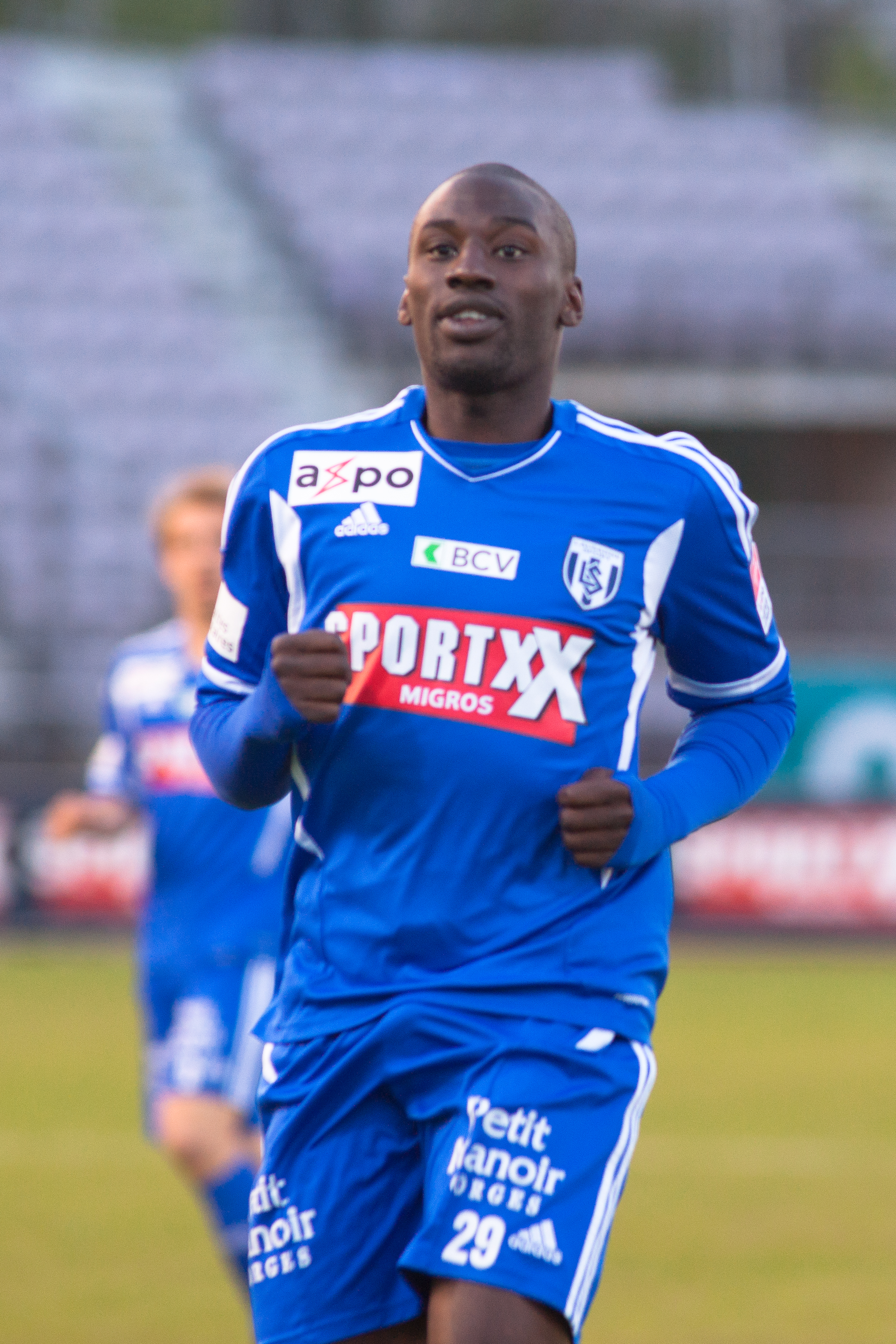
- Moussilou in 2012

Personal information
- Full name: Matt Devlin Moussilou Massamba
- Date of birth: 1 June 1982 (age 44)
- Place of birth: Paris, France
- Height: 1.82 m (6 ft 0 in)
- Position: Striker

Youth career
- 1994–1997: FC Bourget
- 1997–1999: Lille

Senior career*
Years	Team	Apps	(Gls)
1999–2001	Lille B	54	(18)
2001–2006	Lille	98	(24)
2006–2009	Nice	19	(0)
2007	→ Saint-Étienne (loan)	11	(3)
2007	→ Marseille (loan)	4	(0)
2008	→ Al-Arabi (loan)	22	(12)
2008–2009	Nice B	20	(18)
2009–2010	Boulogne	15	(1)
2011–2013	Lausanne-Sport	70	(17)
2013–2014	Club Africain	12	(2)
2014–2015	Amiens	11	(0)
2015–2016	Le Mont	9	(2)
2016–2017	Yverdon-Sport	24	(18)
2017–2021	Meyrin	75	(59)

International career
2003	France U21	4	(1)
2009–2013	Congo	12	(3)
- * Club domestic league appearances and goals

Matt Moussilou (born 1 June 1982) is a former professional footballer who played as a striker. Born in France, he was capped by Congo at international level.

== Club career ==
On 2 April 2005, Moussilou scored four goals for Lille in a 8–0 win over Istres, including a hat-trick in four minutes to be the fastest in Ligue 1 history. On 3 February 2007, he played his first Ligue 1 match for Saint-Étienne against Sedan. He played as a striker for Nice and after returning from a loan to Al-Arabi, he was on 27 August 2009 released from his club.

On 7 September 2009, it was announced that he had joined Swansea City on trial but on 6 October he signed for Boulogne on a free transfer, until the end of the season. With Boulogne's relegation at the end of the campaign, Moussilou did not re-sign. In January 2011, he signed with Lausanne-Sport until the end of the 2010–11 season. Moussilou would go on to spend two and half years with the club before moving on to sign for Tunisian-side Club Africain.

== International career ==
In 2006, Moussilou was called up to represent the national team of the Republic of the Congo by their new coach Noel Tosi. Since Moussilou had represented France at under-21 level, however, FIFA ruled against this as he should have applied for the change in his national status before 31 December 2005. However, the rule was changed, and finally he made a full international debut for Congo on 12 August 2009 in a friendly against Morocco. He scored his first goal in this match.

== Personal life ==
Moussilou was born in Paris, France, and is of Beninese and Congolese descent.

== Career statistics ==
Scores and results list Congo's goal tally first, score column indicates score after each Moussilou goal.

List of international goals scored by Matt Moussilou
No.	Date	Venue	Opponent	Score	Result	Competition
1	12 August 2009	Prince Moulay Abdellah Stadium, Rabat, Morocco	Morocco	1–0	1–1	Friendly
2	11 November 2011	Estádio Nacional 12 de Julho, São Tomé, São Tomé and Príncipe	São Tomé and Príncipe	1–0	5–0	2014 FIFA World Cup qualification
3	29 February 2012	Stade Municipal, Pointe-Noire, Republic of the Congo	Uganda	3–1	3–1	2013 Africa Cup of Nations qualification

== Honours ==
Lille

- UEFA Intertoto Cup: 2004
