= Le Creusot TGV station =

High-speed rail station in east-central France

Le Creusot TGV Montceau les Mines–Montchanin
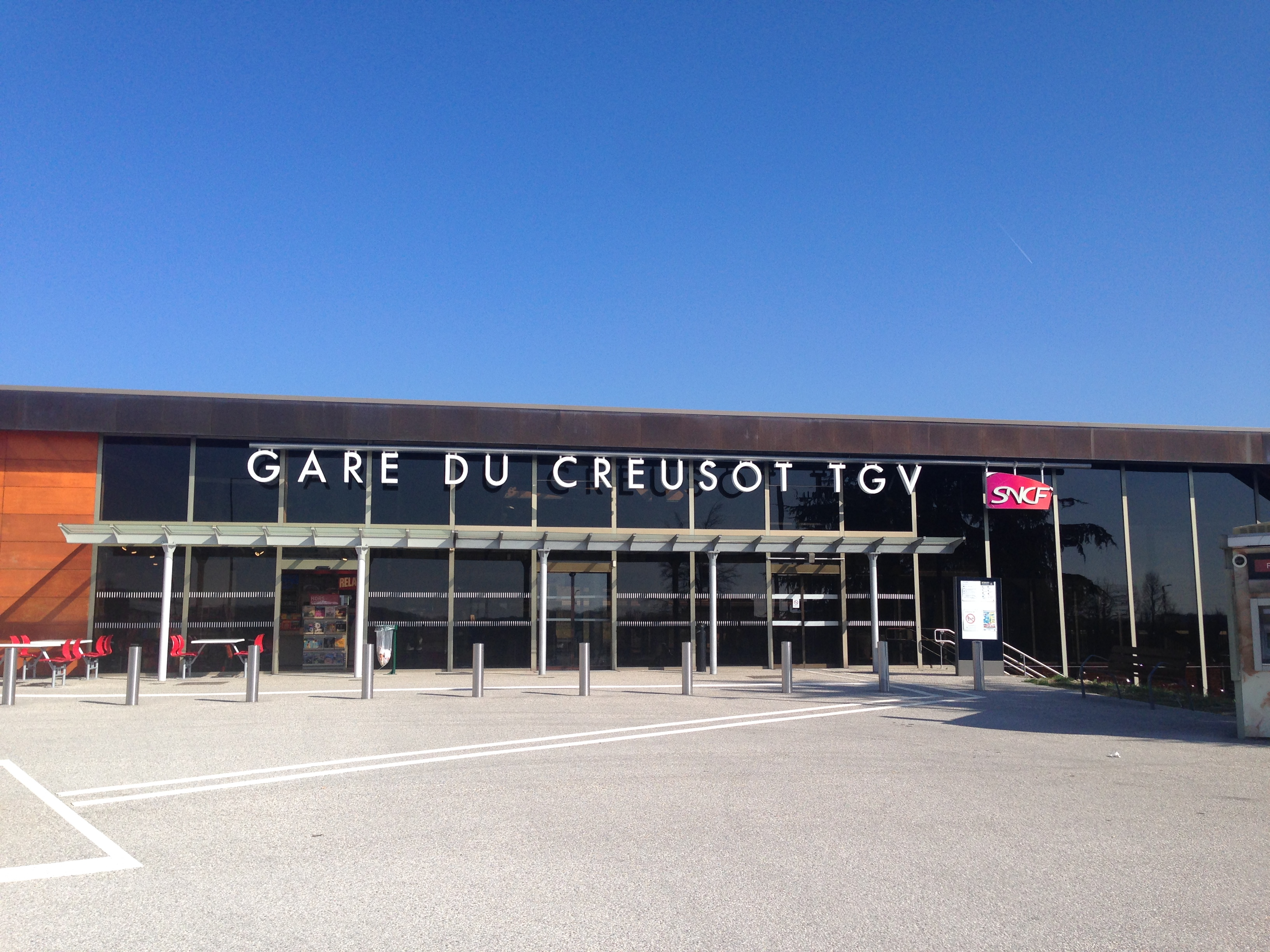
- Le Creusot TGV station entrance

General information
- Location: Écuisses, Saône-et-Loire, Bourgogne-Franche-Comté, France
- Coordinates: 46°45′55″N 4°29′59″E
- Line: LGV Sud-Est
- Platforms: 2 side platforms
- Tracks: 4

Other information
- Station code: 87694109

History
- Opened: 27 September 1981

Passengers
- 683,000 (2024)
Location

Le Creusot TGV (French: Gare du Creusot TGV, Le Creusot-Montceau-Montchanin officially) is a high-speed railway station on the LGV Sud-Est providing TGV services to the city of Le Creusot, Saône-et-Loire, France. It was dedicated on 22 September 1981 by President François Mitterrand and opened to commercial service five days later. The station, located outside the city in the commune of Écuisses, is accessible by road.

The station is arranged with two side tracks with platforms for stopping trains, in addition to two centre tracks for non-stopping trains to pass at full speed.

== Situation ==
By road, the station is 8 km from Le Creusot and 15 km from Montceau-les-Mines.

The next northbound station on LGV Sud-Est is Paris-Gare de Lyon (terminus); the next southbound station is the Gare de Mâcon-Loché TGV. TGV journey times from the station to Paris are 1 hour 20 minutes on average. Lyon is 40 minutes on average. Prior to the opening of the LGV Sud-Est, average times were 3 hours 40 minutes to Paris with a train change in Dijon or Nevers; Lyon was 1 hour 30 minutes away with a train change in Chagny or Chalon-sur-Saône.

55 km north of the station is the highest point on the line at 489 m above sealevel, near the town of Liernais. This is near the range dividing the Seine and Loire river valleys, not far from the Rhône river valley.

== See also ==
- List of TGV stations

Preceding station	SNCF	Following station
Paris-Lyon Terminus	TGV	Mâcon-Loché TGV towards Southeastern France
Marne-la-Vallée–Chessy towards Northern and Eastern France	TGV	Mâcon-Loché TGV towards Southeastern France
Massy TGV towards Western and Southwestern France	TGV	Mâcon-Loché TGV towards Southeastern France
