= Mâcon-Loché TGV station =

High-speed rail station in east-central France

Mâcon–Loché TGV
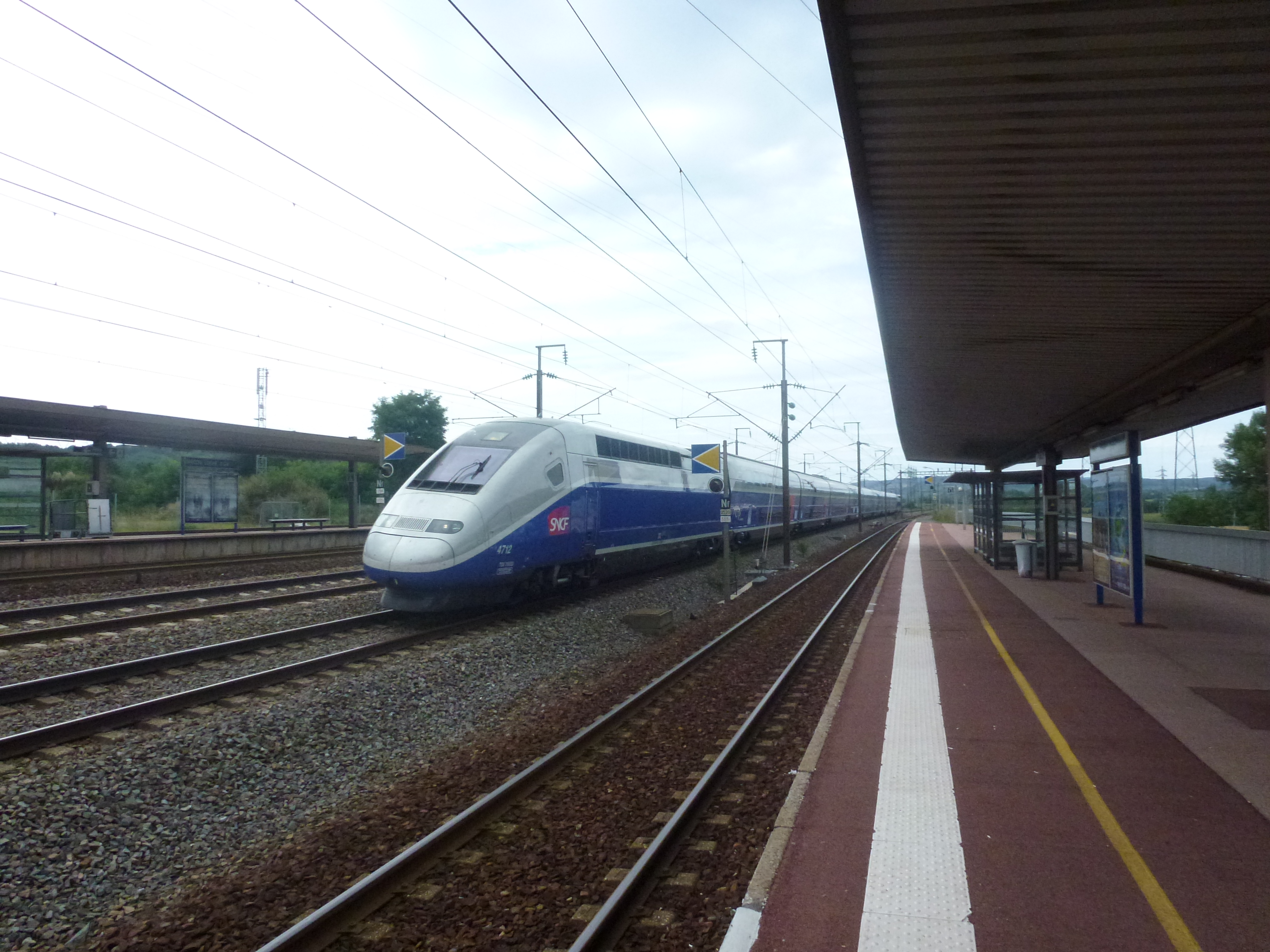
- A TGV passes through Mâcon Loché station

General information
- Location: 142 Rue de Pouilly-Loché; 71000 Mâcon; Saône-et-Loire; France
- Coordinates: 46°16′59″N 4°46′40″E
- Owner: SNCF
- Operator: SNCF
- Line: TGV Sud-Est
- Platforms: 2 side platforms
- Tracks: 4

Other information
- Station code: 87725705

History
- Opened: 27 September 1981

Passengers
- 455,000 (2024)

Services
Preceding station	SNCF	Following station
Paris-Lyon Terminus	TGV inOui	Bourg-en-Bresse towards Annecy
Paris-Lyon Terminus	TGV inOui	Lyon-Saint-Exupéry TGV towards Bourg-Saint-Maurice
Le Creusot TGV towards Paris-Lyon	TGV inOui	Lyon-Part-Dieu towards Lyon-Perrache
Location

Mâcon-Loché TGV station (French: Gare de Mâcon-Loché TGV) is a railway station on the TGV Sud-Est located in the commune of Mâcon, Saône-et-Loire, France. Its address is 142, Rue de Pouilly-Loché, 71000 Mâcon, the station is a few kilometres from the neighbouring town of Loché. The next station southbound is Lyon Part-Dieu and the next northbound station is Le Creusot TGV.

== The station ==
Mâcon-Loché TGV station is a basic station with four tracks. The two inner tracks are reserved for trains passing through; the two outer ones are served by side platforms. The station is connected to the regional rail network via shuttle bus.

In 2019, SNCF customers named Mâcon-Loché station as one of the best in the country for customer satisfaction, coming in behind Meuse and Belfort – Montbéliard.

== History ==
Mâcon-Loché TGV opened on 27 September 1981, along with the first TGV line, the LGV Sud-Est. On 14 September 1992, the first high-speed accident in TGV history occurred at the station when Train 56 derailed while running at 270 km/h (167 mph). Nobody was killed, but some people waiting for another TGV on the platform were injured by ballast kicked up from the trackbed by the train.

== See also ==
- List of SNCF stations in Auvergne-Rhône-Alpes
