= Chantilly–Gouvieux station =

French railway station

Chantilly–Gouvieux
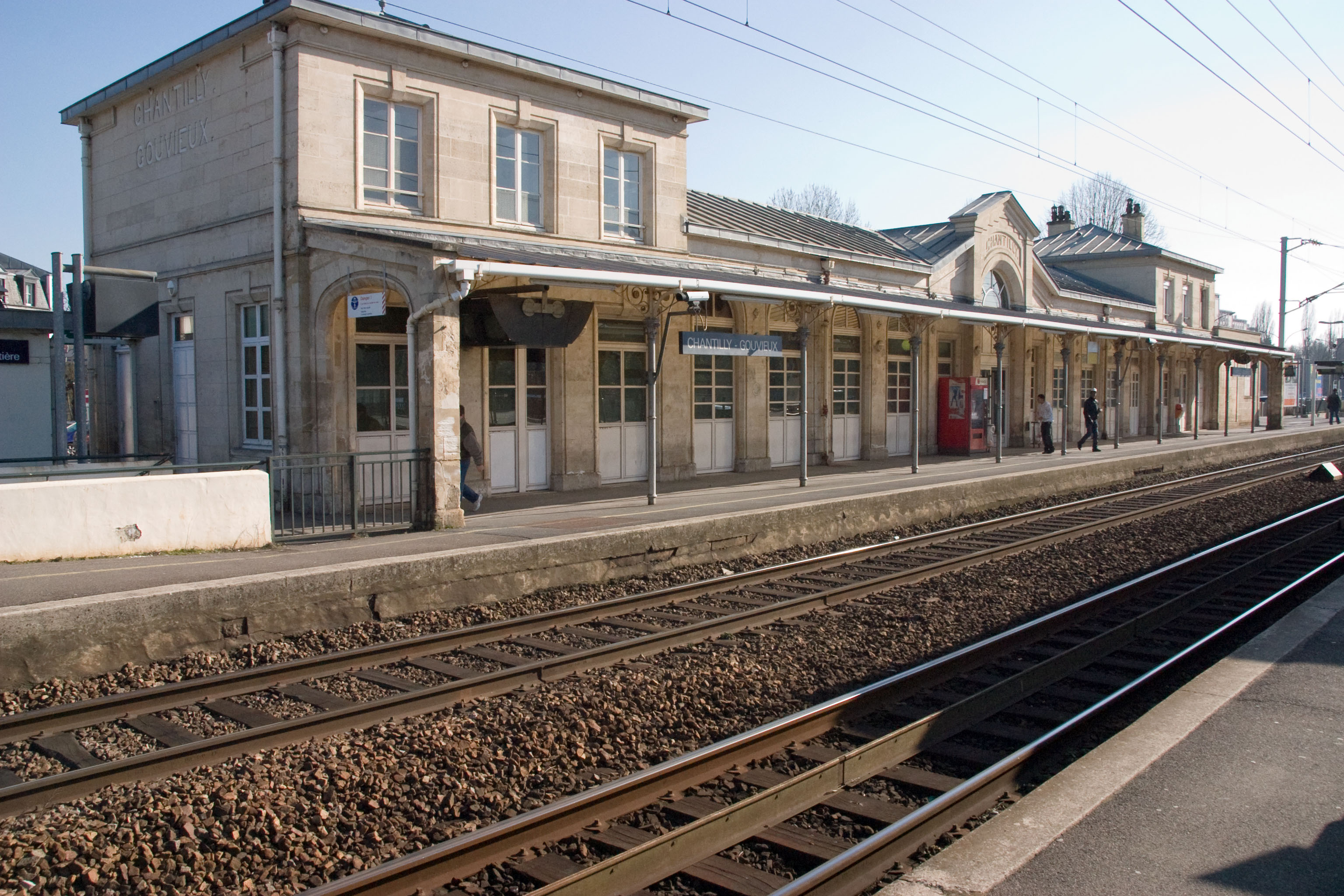

General information
- Location: Chantilly, Oise, Picardy; France
- Coordinates: 49°11′14″N 2°27′35″E
- Lines: Paris–Lille railway RER D
- Platforms: 1 island platform and 1 side platform
- Tracks: 2

Other information
- Station code: 87276113

History
- Opened: 10 May 1859; 167 years ago

Passengers
- 2024: 2,897,119

Services
Preceding station	TER Hauts-de-France	Following station
Creil towards Amiens	Citi C10	Orry-la-Ville–Coye towards Paris-Nord
Creil towards Compiègne	Citi C14	Orry-la-Ville–Coye towards Paris-Nord
Preceding station	RER	Following station
Creil Terminus	RER D	Orry-la-Ville–Coye towards Corbeil-Essonnes
Location

Chantilly–Gouvieux (French pronunciation: [ʃɑ̃tiji ɡuvjø]) is a railway station on both Île-de-France's RER D and the TER Hauts-de-France regional rail network in Chantilly, Oise, France. It is best known for providing access to the historic Château de Chantilly.

== Service ==
There is TER service at Chantilly-Gouvieux complemented by RER D service.
