= Fretin =

- Commune
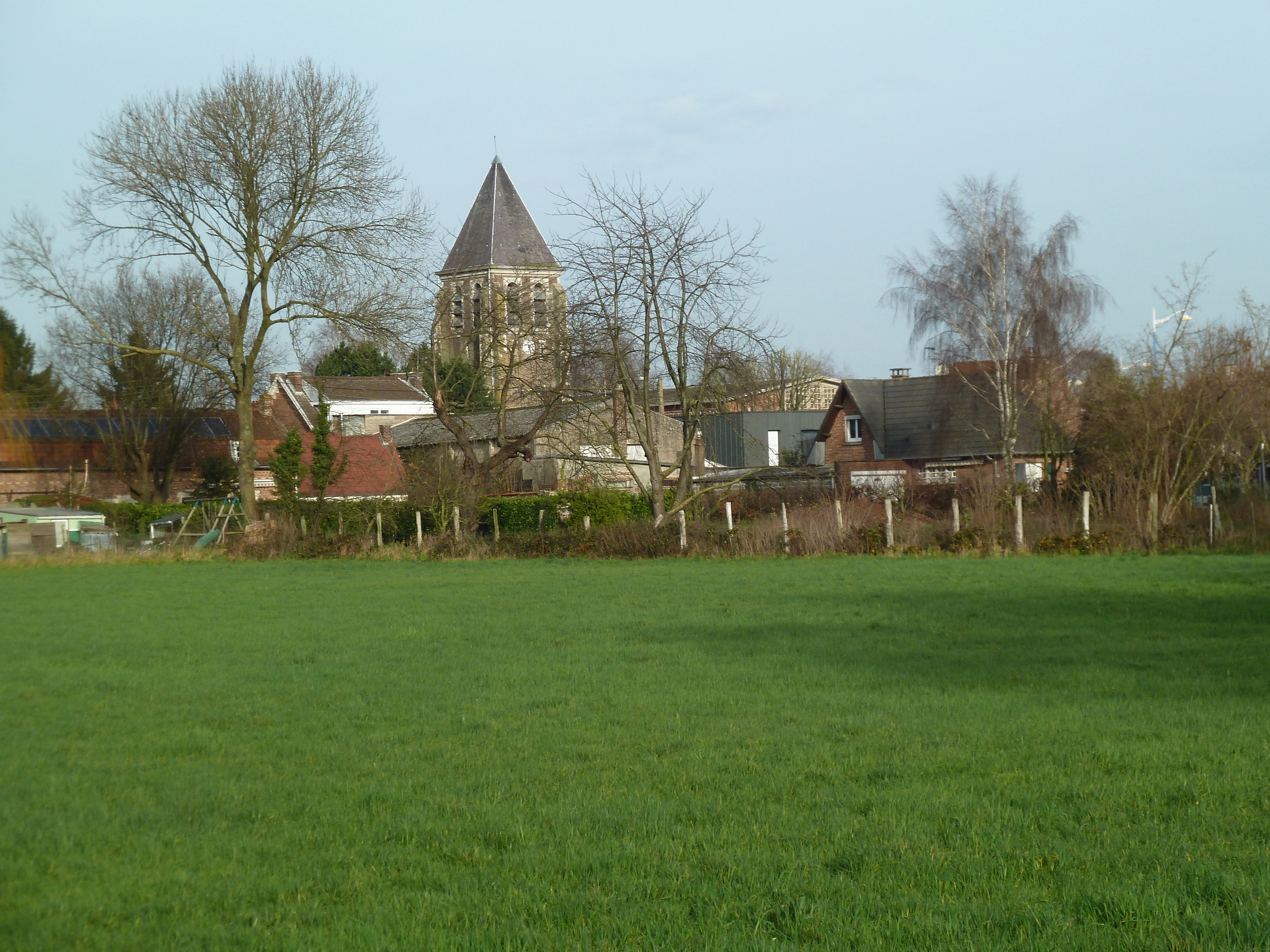
- The church in Fretin

- Coat of arms
- Location of Fretin
- Location within France Location within Hauts-de-France
- Coordinates: 50°33′29″N 3°08′06″E
- Country: France
- Region: Hauts-de-France
- Department: Nord
- Arrondissement: Lille
- Canton: Templeuve-en-Pévèle
- Intercommunality: Métropole Européenne de Lille

Government
  - Mayor (2023–2026): Marie-Jeanne Marseguerra
- Area^{1}: 13.17 km^{2} (5.08 sq mi)
- Elevation: 34 m (112 ft)
- Highest elevation: 54 m (177 ft)
- Lowest elevation: 25 m (82 ft)
- Population (2023): 3,214
  - Density: 244.0/km^{2} (632.1/sq mi)
- Time zone: UTC+01:00 (CET)
  - Summer (DST): UTC+02:00 (CEST)
- INSEE/Postal code: 59256 /59273
- ^{1} French Land Register data, which excludes lakes, ponds, glaciers > 1 km^{2} (0.386 sq mi or 247 acres) and river estuaries.

Fretin (French pronunciation: [fʁətɛ̃]) is a commune in the Nord department in northern France. It is in the south of the Métropole Européenne de Lille.

== Fretin junction ==
Fretin triangle flying junction

It contains the Fretin triangle, a high speed flying junction joining the HSL 1 railway line from Brussels to the LGV Nord from Paris to the Channel Tunnel.

== Population ==
Historical population
Year	Pop.	±% p.a.
1968	2,634	—
1975	2,645	+0.06%
1982	2,565	−0.44%
1990	2,873	+1.43%
1999	2,997	+0.47%
2007	3,258	+1.05%
2012	3,340	+0.50%
2017	3,380	+0.24%
2023	3,214	−0.84%
Source: INSEE

== Notable people ==
- Mathieu Debuchy (born 1985) a football player.

== Heraldry ==
Arms of Fretin	The arms of Fretin are blazoned : Bendy argent and azure. (Fretin, Saultain and Wannehain use the same arms.)

== See also ==
- Communes of the Nord department
