= LGV Nord =

French high-speed railway

Coordinates: 49.9091°N 2.8489°E

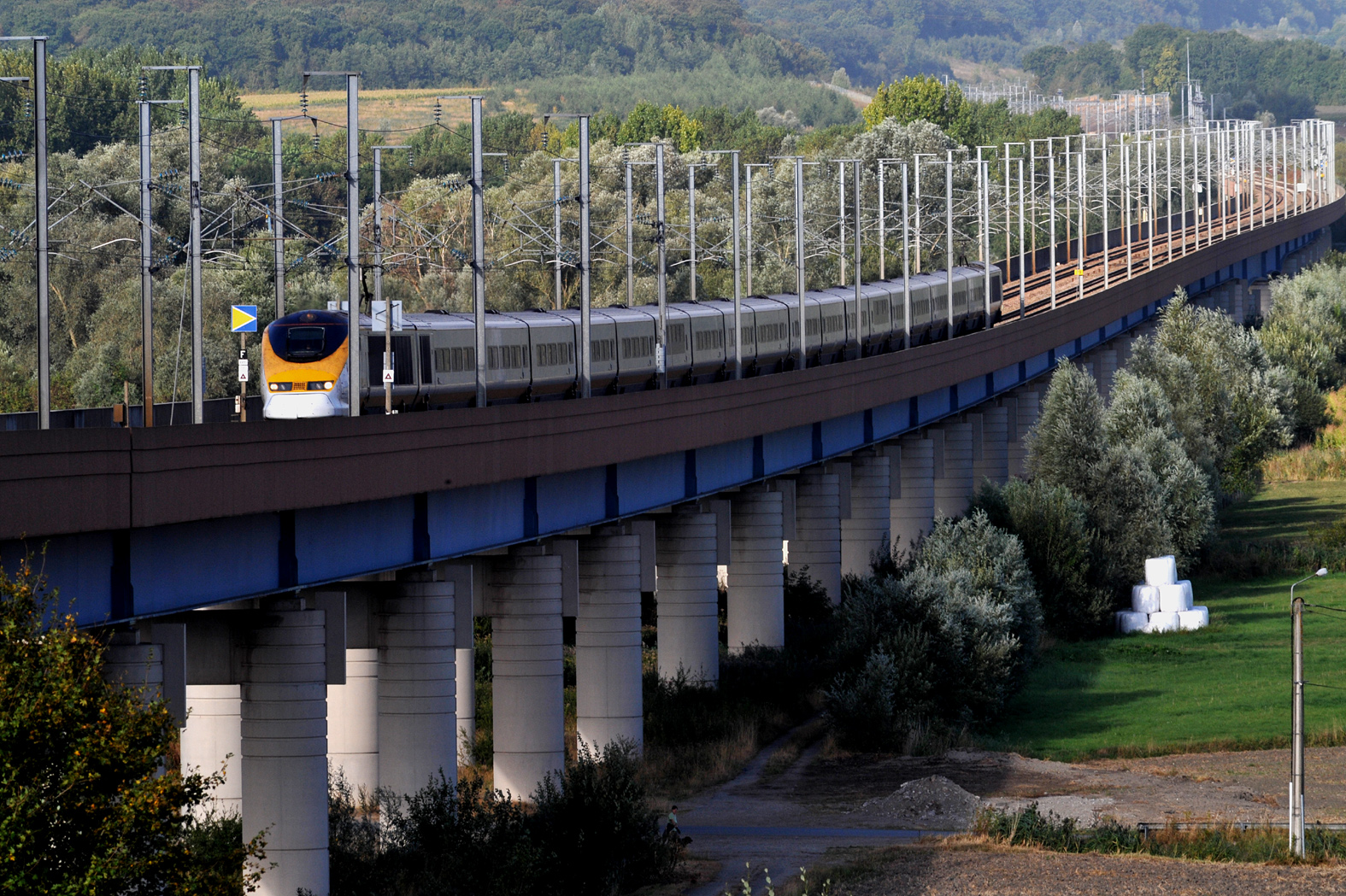
- Eurostar north of Watten

Overview
- Status: Operational
- Owner: SNCF Réseau
- Locale: France (Hauts-de-France, Île-de-France)
- Termini: Channel Tunnel; Gare du Nord
- Stations: 4

Service
- Type: High-speed rail
- System: SNCF
- Operator(s): Eurostar; SNCF
- Rolling stock: High speed

History
- Opened: 1993

Technical
- Line length: 333 km (207 mi)
- Num of tracks: Double track throughout + loops
- Track gauge: 1,435 mm (4 ft 8 1/2 in) standard gauge
- Loading gauge: UIC GC
- Electrification: Overhead line, 25 kV 50 Hz AC
- Operating speed: 300 km/h (190 mph)
- Signalling: TVM-430

The Ligne à Grande Vitesse Nord (English: North High-Speed Line), typically shortened to LGV Nord, is a French 333-kilometre-long (207 mi) high-speed rail line, opened in 1993, that connects Paris to the Belgian border and the Channel Tunnel via Lille.

With a maximum speed of 300 kilometres per hour (190 mph), the line appreciably shortened rail journeys between Paris and Lille. Its extensions to the north (Belgium, the Channel Tunnel) and the south (via the LGV Interconnexion Est) have reduced journey times to Great Britain and Benelux and for inter-regional trips between the Nord (Pas de Calais) region and the southeast and southwest of France. Its route is twinned with the A1 for 130 kilometres (81 mi), which is why it was given its official nickname, the A1 Highway. As it is mostly built in flat areas, the maximum incline is 25 metres per kilometre (2.5‰).

Of all French high-speed lines, the LGV Nord sees the widest variety of high-speed rolling stock: the Alstom-made TGV POS, TGV Réseau, TGV Atlantique, TGV Duplex, Eurostar e300, Thalys PBA and PBKA and the Siemens Velaro-derived Eurostar e320, as well as rolling stock on local trains. Traffic is controlled by the Lille rail traffic centre.

== Route ==
The LGV Nord begins at Arnouville-lès-Gonesse, 16.6 kilometres (10.3 mi) from the Gare du Nord on the Paris–Lille railway line. At Vémars, the LGV Interconnexion Est joins it via a triangular junction, leading to Charles de Gaulle Airport and Marne-la-Vallée-Chessy; this enables direct trains from London and Amsterdam to Disneyland Paris, as well as the southern destinations (Lyon, Avignon and Marseille)

After passing east of the forest of Ermenonville over the viaduc de Verberie, it joins the A1 around Chevrières and accompanies it to the Lille suburbs.

At Ablaincourt-Pressoir (Somme), a new station, Gare TGV Haute-Picardie, is served only by inter-regional TGVs. At Croisilles, Pas-de-Calais, a junction leads to the Agny link towards Arras. The LGV crosses the A1 autoroute at Seclin (Nord).

Fretin triangle flying junction

At Fretin, a triangular junction links the LGV to the Lille-Brussels HSL 1 high-speed line eastwards, crossing the border at Wannehain and joining the conventional network at Lembeek, south of Brussels. After the Fretin junction, the LGV has a connection to the conventional network at Lezennes, near Lille. This junction is used for TGVs terminating at Lille, which use Lille-Flandres. TGVs that continue beyond Lille, as well as some Eurostar services, stop at Lille-Europe instead. Non-stop Eurostars pass through a tunnel under the city of Lille at 200 kilometres per hour (120 mph).

The line passes south of Armentières and north of Hazebrouck. At Cassel, a link provides a connection with Dunkirk. The LGV continues west, crossing the A26 autoroute at Zouafques and ends at Calais-Fréthun, at the Eurotunnel terminal. This enables TGV service to Calais and Eurostars through the Channel Tunnel to London. The TGVs continue to Calais-Ville or reverse in either Calais stations and go on to Boulogne-sur-Mer and Étaples-Le Touquet and Rang-du-Fliers-Verton. The route was much criticised, particularly by those in the Picardy region. The LGV crosses the region without a stop; Amiens in particular would have liked to have been on the line. The government judged a route via Amiens to be impracticable, as the Lille route demanded a straight line between Paris and Lille in order to give a reasonable Paris-Lille-London journey time. The LGV Picardie project would address this issue by serving Amiens, and would reduce the Paris–London journey time to less than 2 hours.

== Stations ==
The LGV Nord serves the following stations:

- Gare du Nord (Paris)
- Gare TGV Haute-Picardie^{1}
- Gare d'Arras²
- Gare de Lille-Europe
- Gare de Calais-Fréthun

^{1} Haute-Picardie station has been nicknamed "Gare des Betteraves" or "Beetroot Station," since it is located in the middle of nowhere and is only accessible by good road connections. Amiens wanted a station closer to the town centre, stopping at Gare d'Amiens.
² Arras station is reached via a branch of the LGV Nord that splits off near the village of Croisilles.

== History ==
- 1984: The Lyon-Lille connection by TGV began, using conventional lines between the Île-de-France and Lille.
- 29 September 1989: declaration of public utility
- 2 September 1991: commencement of tracklaying
- 9 September 1992: catenary in service
- 20 October 1992: first trials with TGV Atlantique trainset 301
- 23 May 1993: service commences between Paris and Arras
- 21 December 1993: TGV 7150 from Valenciennes to Paris, operated by set 511, derailed at 300 kilometres per hour (190 mph) at the site of TGV Haute Picardie station (before it was built). Rain had caused a hole to open up under the track; the hole dated from the First World War but had not been detected during construction. The front power car and the front four carriages derailed, but remained aligned with the track. Out of the 200 passengers, one was slightly injured.
- 14 November 1994: First Eurostar service from Waterloo international To Paris Nord. The first service from The UK to France by Eurostar was made on the 14 November Connecting the now disused London Waterloo international via HS1 and the Channel Tunnel, Across LGV Nord to Paris (Gare du Nord). The full day service through to Paris Nord and Brussels south began later (28 May 1995.)

The line was designed to facilitate European connections. The foreseen opening of the Channel Tunnel made it a project of the utmost urgency, leading to an acceleration of work. It opened in 1993, a year before the tunnel, from Arnouville to Fréthun; the Belgian section followed in 1997.

== Services ==
Journey times and daily train frequency:

=== From Paris ===
- Paris–Lille 1:00/24
- Paris–Douai 1:09/10
- Paris–Valenciennes 1:42/10
- Paris–Arras 0:49/9
- Paris–Dunkirk 1:38/9
- Paris–Lens 1:05/7
- Paris–Béthune 1:15/7
- Paris–Calais 1:23/5
- Paris–Cambrai 1:40/1
- Paris–St-Omer 1:56/1
- Paris–Boulogne 1:57/1

=== Inter-regional ===
- Lyon–Lille 2:48/11
- Lyon–Arras 2:46/3
- Lyon–Brussels 3:40/2
- Nantes–Lille 3:53/4
- Rennes–Lille 3:49/4
- Bordeaux–Lille 5:00/5

=== International ===
- Paris – London 2:15
- Paris – Brussels 1:20
- London - Marne-la-Vallee - Chessy (for Disneyland Paris) 2:43
- London - Marseille: 6:28
- Paris – Liège 2:10
- Paris – Cologne 3:14
- Paris – Amsterdam 3:18
- Lille – London 1:20
- Amsterdam - London - 3:55

=== Future services ===
At present, only Deutsche Bahn has applied for use of the line and in 2009 regulations were relaxed to allow its trains to use the Channel Tunnel. Other proposals are yet to be formalised.

==== Deutsche Bahn ====
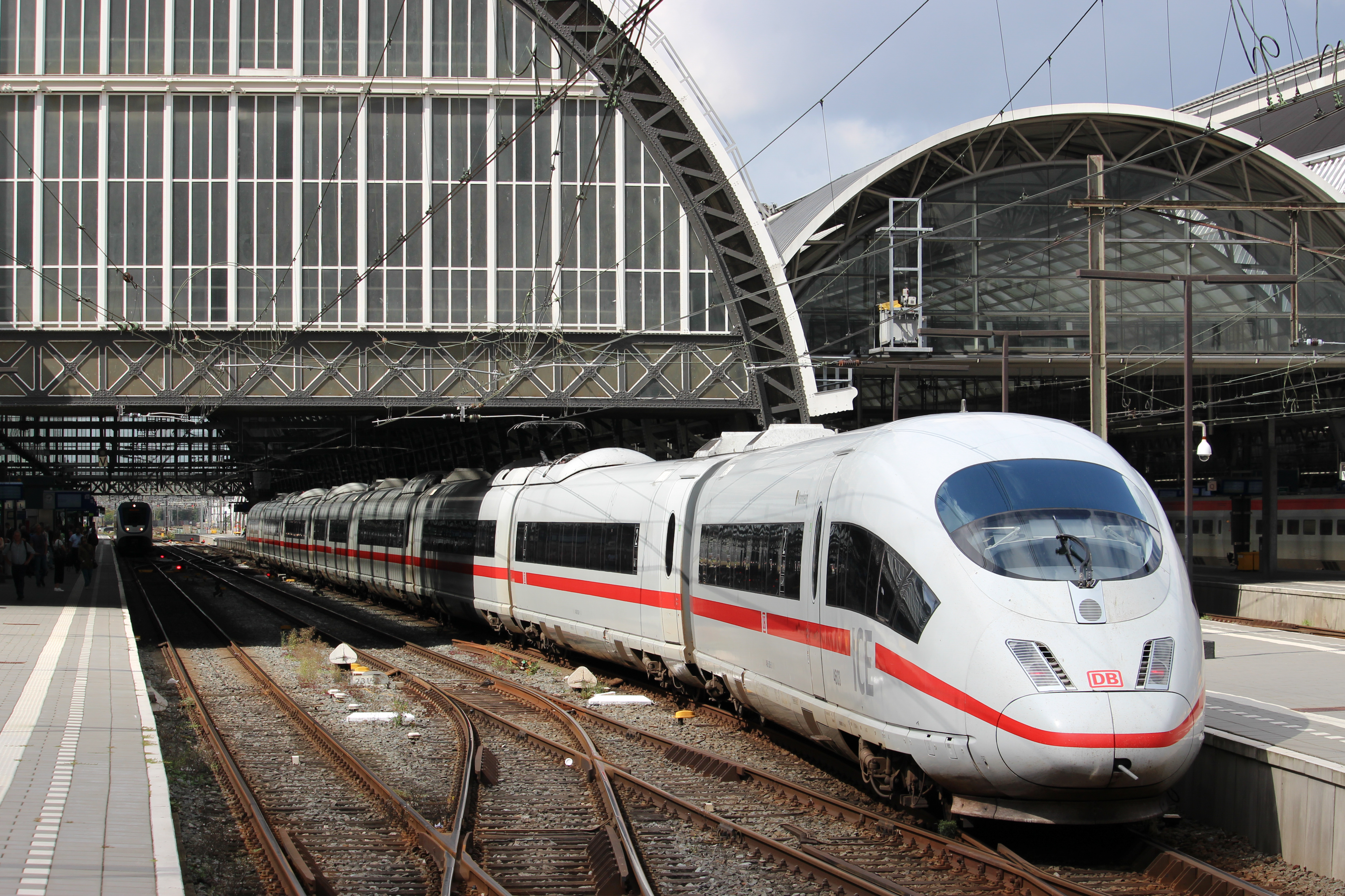
A Deutsche Bahn high-speed train

In 2009, Eurotunnel (the owners of the Channel Tunnel) announced that it was prepared to start relaxing the fire safety regulations, in order to permit other operators, such as Deutsche Bahn, to transport passengers via the Tunnel using other forms of rolling stock via LGV Nord. Under the deregulation of European railway service, high-speed lines were opened up to open access on 1 January 2010; the Inter-Governmental Commission on the Channel Tunnel (IGC) announced that it was considering relaxing the safety requirements concerning train splitting. LCR suggested that high-speed rail services between London and Cologne could commence before the 2012 Olympics. As of March 2010 Eurotunnel, High Speed 1, DB and other interested train operators formed a working group to discuss changes to the safety rules, including allowing DB's 200 metres (660 ft) trains through the tunnel on a Frankfurt to London service.

Deutsche Bahn hope to run an ICE 3 train through the Channel Tunnel on 19 October 2010, in preparation for possible future operations. The current Velaro ICE3 sets do not meet the fire safety requirements necessary for the carriage of passengers through the Channel Tunnel, but the Siemens Velaro D sets on order include the necessary additional fire-proofing. DB are considering a Frankfurt to London service which could start in 2020 taking about 4 to 5 hours with stops at Cologne and Brussels. The ICE 4 trains that are planned to be used on the route are yet to be given their permit to travel at speed through northern France and Belgium, increasing the time it will take for this service to come in fruition, but DB now allegedly plan to start a dual service. This would entail the use of two ICE 4 trains tethered together, travelling as far as Brussels Midi, before splitting, where one train will carry on to Amsterdam via Rotterdam and the other to Frankfurt via Cologne.

==== Veolia ====
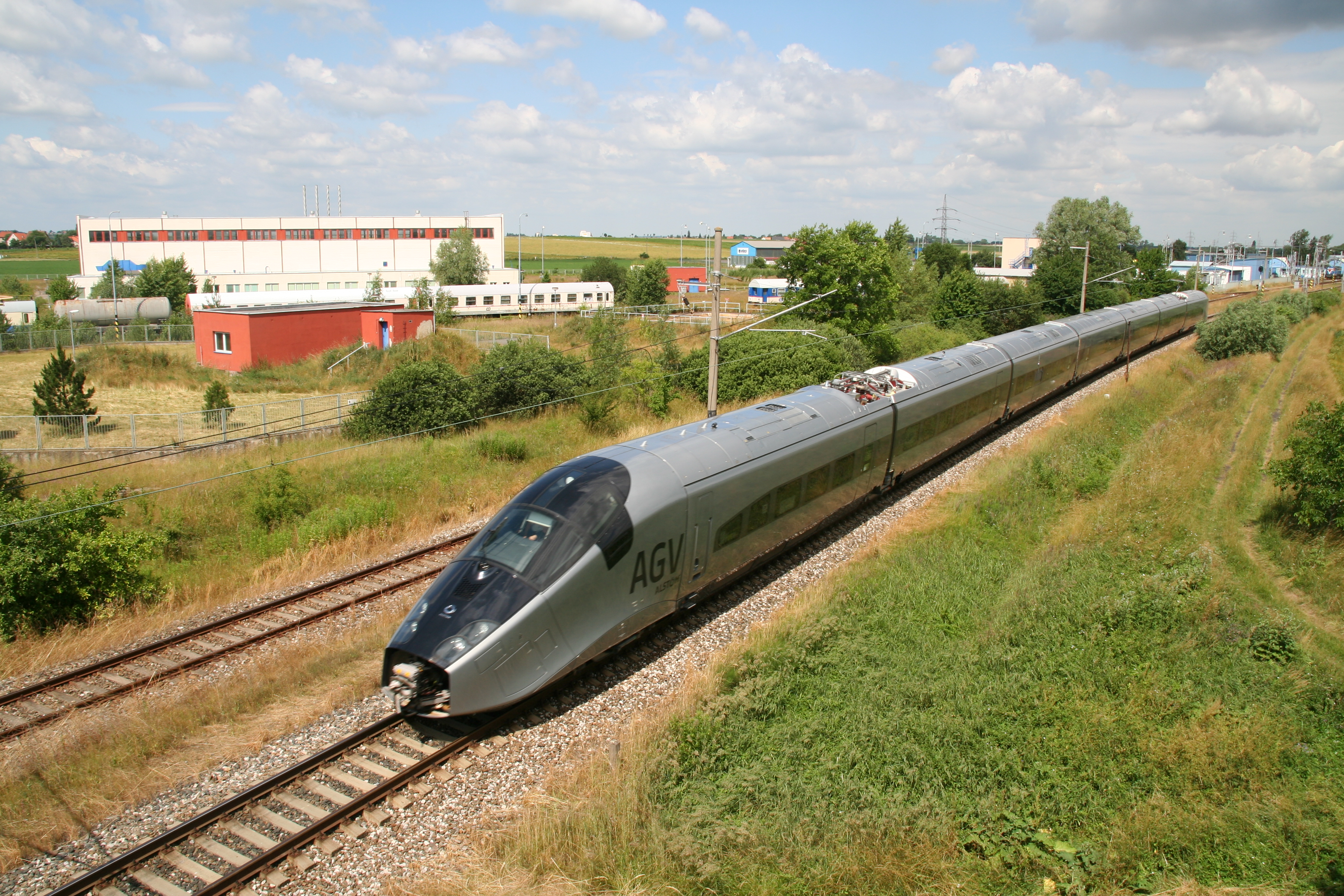
Veolia's planned use of the AGV train would cut journey times to London

In September 2008, Air France-KLM indicated a desire to take advantage of the change in the law and apply to run rail services. However, in October 2009, Air France withdrew its interest. This led to Veolia looking for new partners, with the announcement that it would begin working on new proposals in cooperation with Trenitalia to run services from Paris to Strasbourg, London and Brussels.

==== Renfe ====
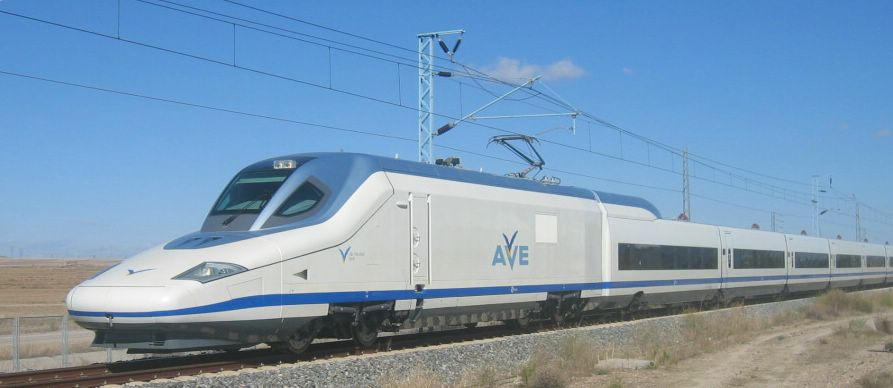
Spanish AVE train

Spanish railway operator RENFE has also shown an interest in running AVE services from Madrid to London via Barcelona, Lyon and Paris on its AVE network, which connects to the French network via the Barcelona to Figueras and Perpignan to Figueras lines.

== See also ==
- High-speed rail in France
