= LGV Interconnexion Est =

French high-speed railway

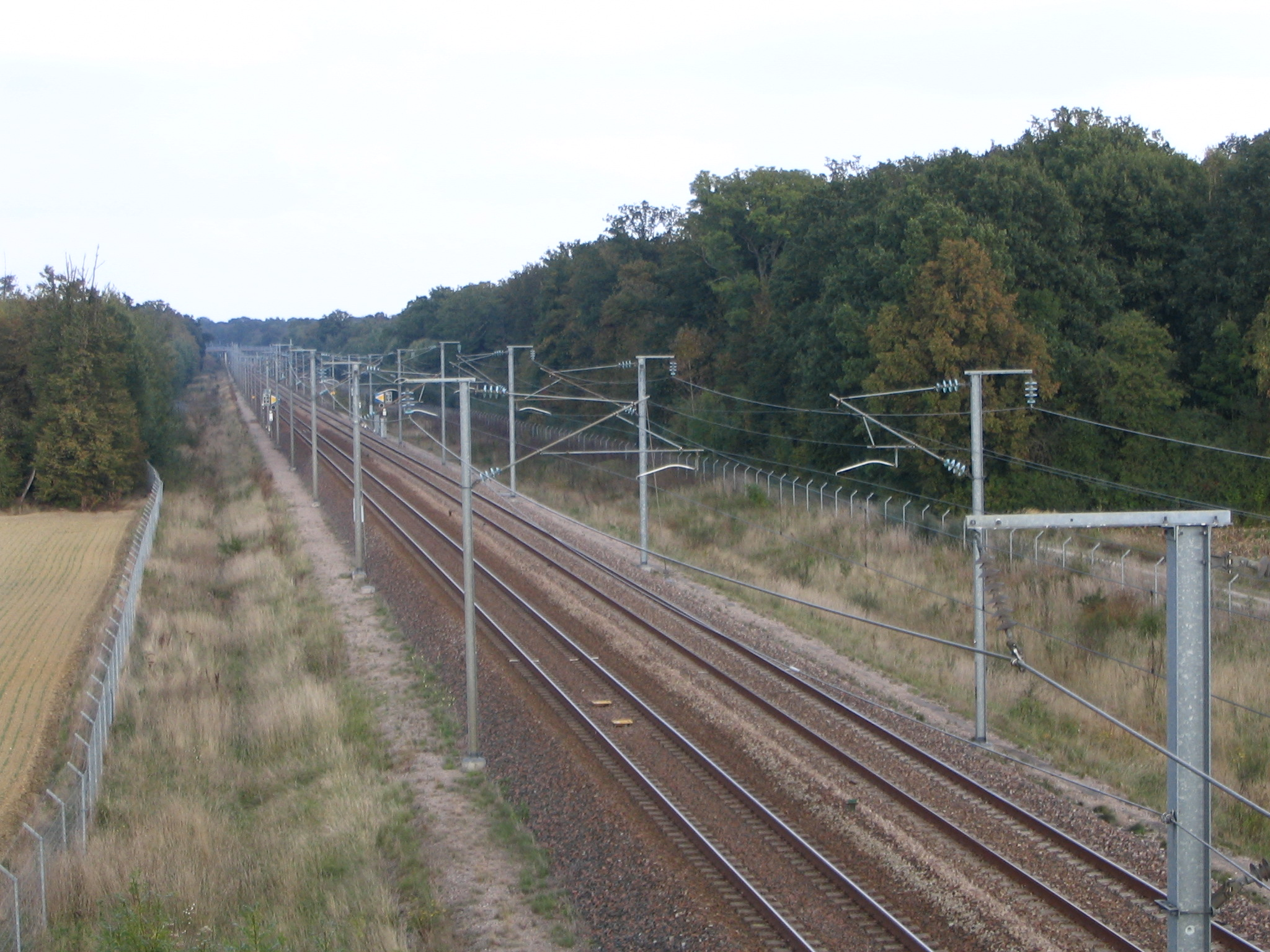
- LGV Interconnexion Est at Presles-en-Brie

Overview
- Status: Operational
- Owner: SNCF Réseau
- Locale: Île-de-France; France
- Termini: Vémars, Val-d'Oise; Coubert, Seine-et-Marne
- Stations: Marne-la-Vallée–Chessy TGV; Aéroport Charles de Gaulle 2 TGV

Service
- Type: High-speed rail
- System: SNCF
- Operator: SNCF

History
- Opened: 1994

Technical
- Line length: 90 km (56 mi)
- Num of tracks: Double track
- Track gauge: 1,435 mm (4 ft 8 1/2 in) standard gauge
- Electrification: 25 kV AC 50 HZ OHLE
- Operating speed: 300 km/h (186 mph)
- Signalling: TVM 430

The LGV Interconnexion Est is a French high-speed rail line that connects the LGV Nord, LGV Est, LGV Sud-Est and LGV Atlantique through the suburbs of Paris. Opened in 1994, it consists of three branches, which begin at Coubert:

- west branch: towards Paris and western France, terminating at Valenton at the Grande Ceinture line, which connects to the LGV Atlantique at Massy TGV
- north branch: towards northern France, London and Brussels, joining the LGV Nord at Vémars
- south branch: towards southeastern France, joining the LGV Sud-Est at Moisenay

The south and west branches are now shared with the LGV Sud-Est line.

Maximum line-speed throughout is 300 km/h (186 mph).

== Route ==
Starting from the south (LGV Sud-Est), the line begins at Coubert junction and heads northeast. Near Tournan, there is a link to the Paris-Coulommiers line. Further north, Marne-la-Vallée – Chessy TGV station (transfer to the RER A) serves the new town of Marne-la-Vallée and Disneyland Paris theme parks. Near Claye-Souilly, two links under construction will join the line to the LGV Est. The route next serves Aéroport Charles de Gaulle 2 TGV station (transfer to the RER B and air transport). Shortly thereafter, the line joins the LGV Nord at Vémars junction.

== Journey times ==
- Lille–Roissy CDG 0:50
- London – Marne-la-Vallée–Chessy TGV (for Disneyland Paris) 2:43
- Lille–Lyon 2:50
- Lille–Nantes 3:50
- Lille–Grenoble 4:25
- Lille–Marseille 4:30
- Lille–Bordeaux 5:00
- Brussels–Lyon 3:40
- Brussels–Marseille 5:25
- Brussels–Valence 4:30
- Brussels–Rennes 4:50
- Brussels–Montpellier 5:40

== Expansion ==
- The construction of a suburban line along the LGV between Villeparisis and Vémars is under consideration. This project could have two possible purposes: to serve Roissy airport from Paris (as an alternative to the CDG Express); or to be the beginning of a western line linking Creil to Meaux, Marne-la-Vallée and Melun.
- It has also been proposed to complement the Interconnexion Est with an LGV Interconnexion Sud or LGV Interconnexion Ouest.
- In November 2010, RFF began formal studies of a link from the Interconnexion Est to the Paris - Creil - Amiens line.

== See also ==
- High-speed rail in France
- Paris-Charles de Gaulle Airport
- Roissy-Picardie Link
