= Orry-la-Ville–Coye station =

Railway station in Orry-la-Ville, France

Coordinates: 49.138°N 2.490°E

Orry-la-Ville–Coye
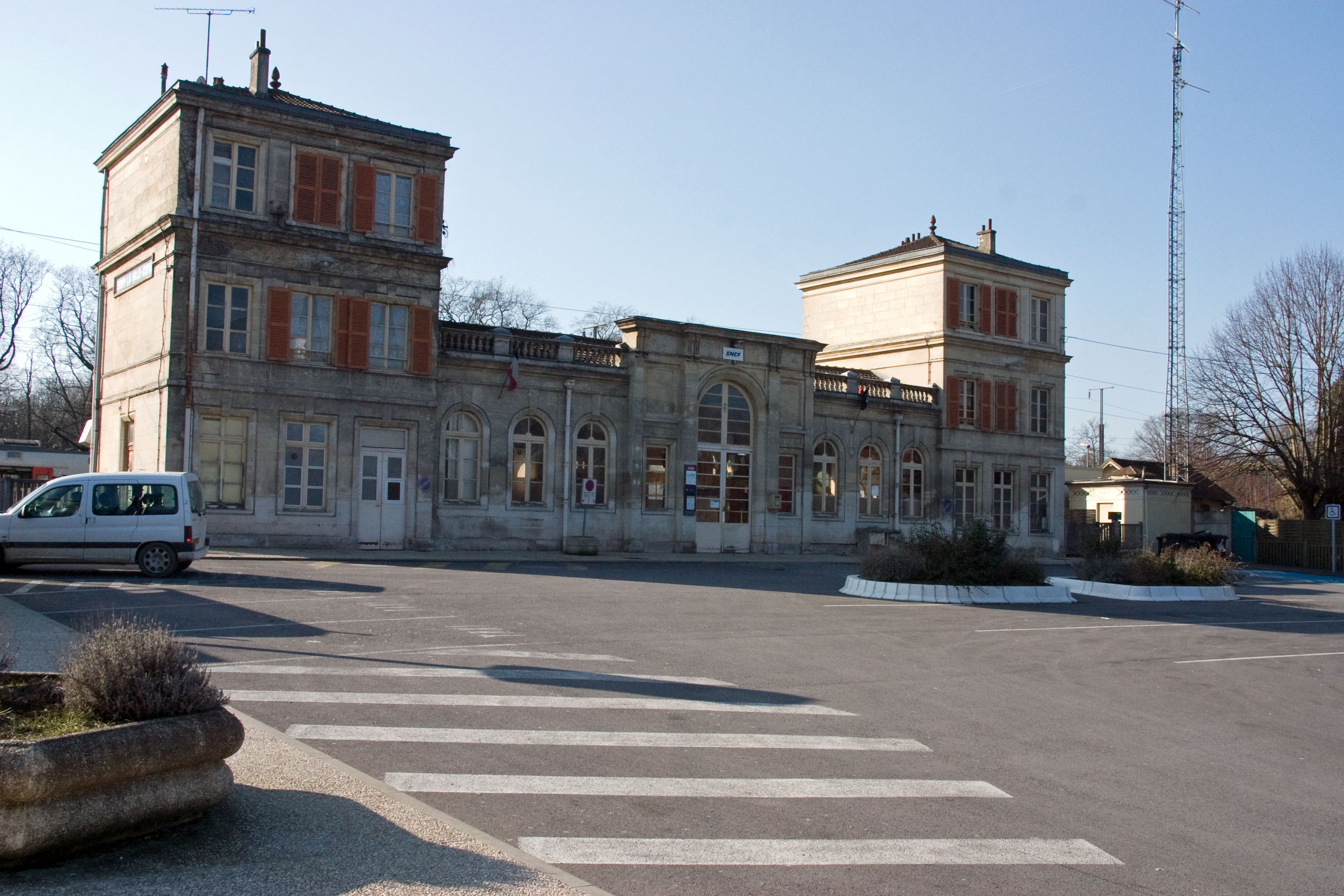

General information
- Location: Place de la Gare, 60560 Orry-la-Ville; France
- Owner: SNCF
- Operator: SNCF
- Line: RER D
- Platforms: 4
- Tracks: 3

Construction
- Architect: Lejeune

Other information
- Station code: 87276279

History
- Opened: 10 May 1859; 167 years ago

Passengers
- 2024: 1,706,267

Services
Preceding station	TER Hauts-de-France	Following station
Chantilly–Gouvieux towards Amiens	Citi C10	Paris-Nord Terminus
Chantilly–Gouvieux towards Compiègne	Citi C14	Paris-Nord Terminus
Preceding station	RER	Following station
Chantilly–Gouvieux towards Creil	RER D	La Borne Blanche towards Corbeil-Essonnes
Location

Orry-la-Ville–Coye (French pronunciation: [ɔʁi la vil kwa]) is a railway station serving Orry-la-Ville and Coye-la-Forêt in Oise to the north-northeast of Paris, France. It is on the road between the two towns, on the Paris–Lille railway. It opened in 1859.

The station has a station building and four tracks served by two lateral platforms as well as a central platform. It is one of two stations in Orry-la-Ville with La Borne Blanche, closer to the town centre.

== Services ==
The station's services are:

- RER D towards Paris and Creil;
- Main lines (TER Hauts-de-France) towards Paris and Amiens.

Due to the station being located outside Île-de-France, its monthly and yearly rail pass, the Navigo card, cannot be used and so standard SNCF ticketing is used.
