= Wannehain =

- Commune
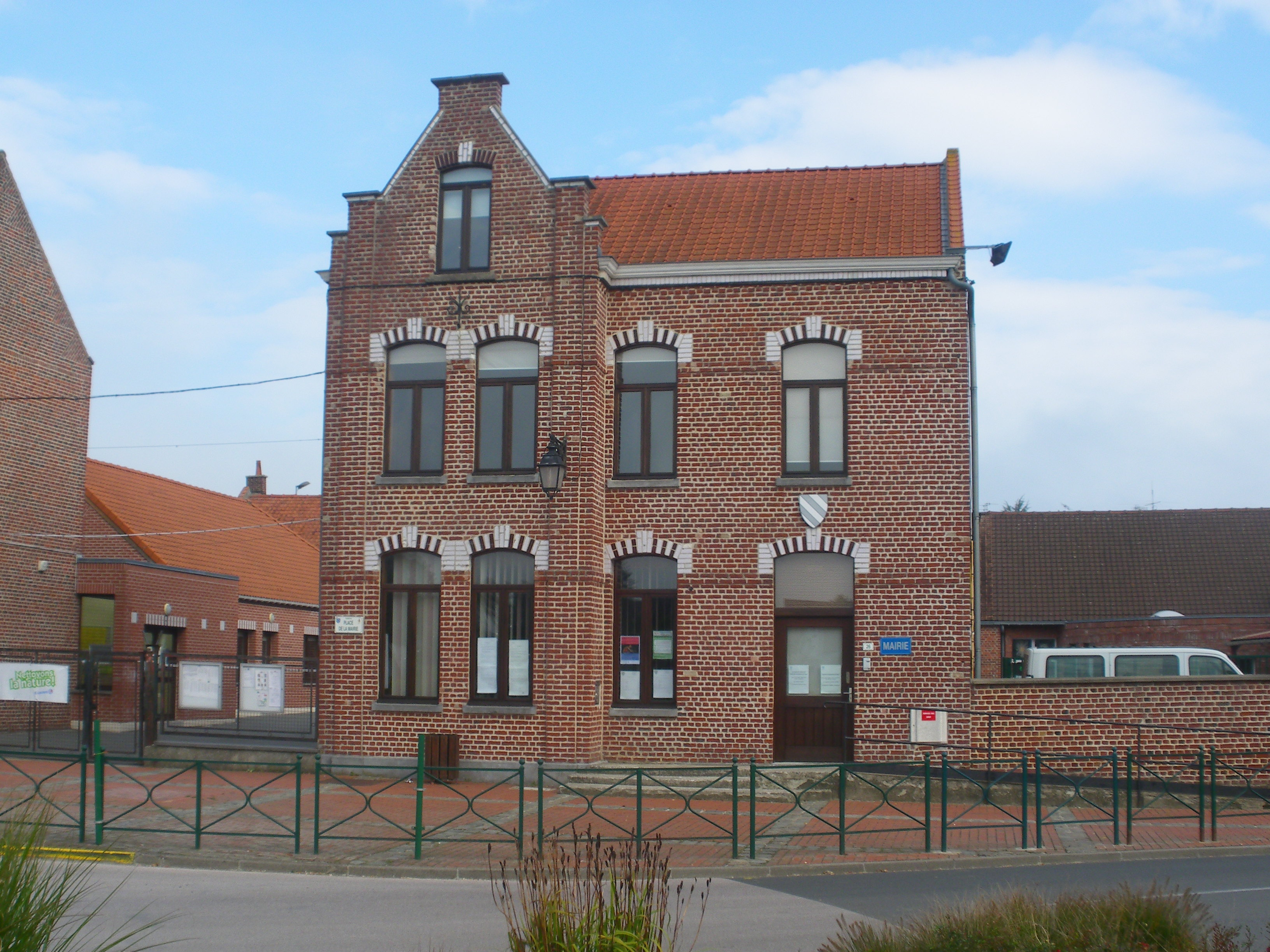
- The town hall in Wannehain

- Coat of arms
- Location of Wannehain
- Location within France Location within Hauts-de-France
- Coordinates: 50°34′10″N 3°15′59″E
- Country: France
- Region: Hauts-de-France
- Department: Nord
- Arrondissement: Lille
- Canton: Templeuve-en-Pévèle
- Intercommunality: Pévèle Carembault

Government
  - Mayor (2020–2026): Jean-Luc Lefebvre
- Area^{1}: 3.71 km^{2} (1.43 sq mi)
- Elevation: 43 m (141 ft)
- Highest elevation: 61 m (200 ft)
- Lowest elevation: 34 m (112 ft)
- Population (2023): 1,338
  - Density: 361/km^{2} (934/sq mi)
- Time zone: UTC+01:00 (CET)
  - Summer (DST): UTC+02:00 (CEST)
- INSEE/Postal code: 59638 /59830
- ^{1} French Land Register data, which excludes lakes, ponds, glaciers > 1 km^{2} (0.386 sq mi or 247 acres) and river estuaries.

Wannehain is a commune in the Nord department in northern France, on the border with Belgium.

The HSL 1 railway line to Brussels crosses the border at Wannehain.

== Heraldry ==
Arms of Wannehain	The arms of Wannehain are blazoned : Bendy argent and azure. (Fretin, Saultain and Wannehain use the same arms.)

== Population ==
Historical population
Year	Pop.	±% p.a.
1968	484	—
1975	570	+2.36%
1982	583	+0.32%
1990	742	+3.06%
1999	839	+1.37%
2007	905	+0.95%
2012	1,155	+5.00%
2017	1,272	+1.95%
2023	1,338	+0.85%
Source: INSEE

== See also ==
- Communes of the Nord department
