= Écuisses =

- Commune
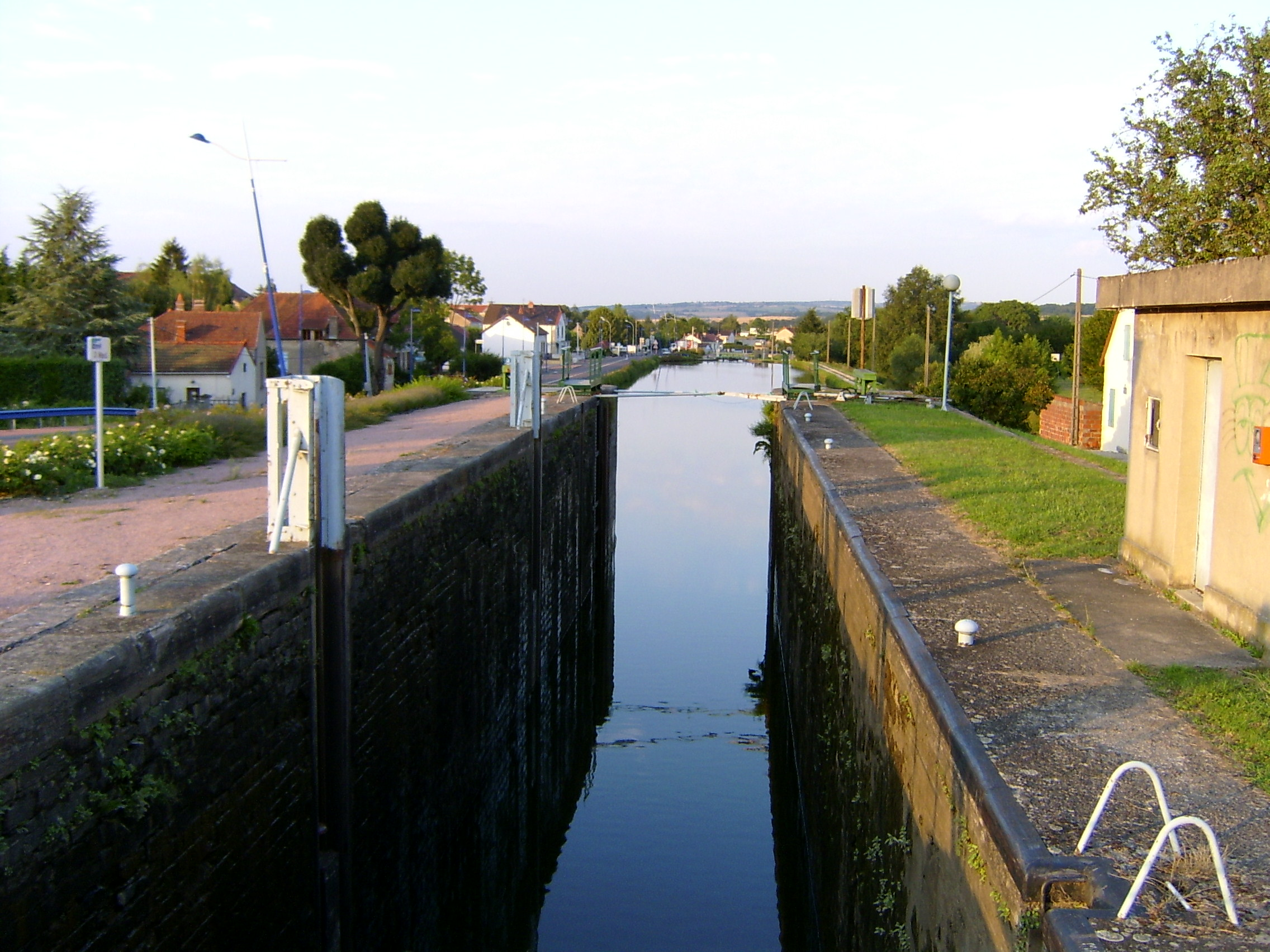
- Canal du centre
- Location of Écuisses
- Location within France Location within Bourgogne-Franche-Comté
- Coordinates: 46°45′24″N 4°32′23″E
- Country: France
- Region: Bourgogne-Franche-Comté
- Department: Saône-et-Loire
- Arrondissement: Autun
- Canton: Blanzy
- Intercommunality: CU Creusot Montceau
- Area^{1}: 13.38 km^{2} (5.17 sq mi)
- Elevation: 314 m (1,030 ft)
- Highest elevation: 431 m (1,414 ft)
- Lowest elevation: 270 m (890 ft)
- Population (2023): 1,652
  - Density: 123.5/km^{2} (319.8/sq mi)
- Time zone: UTC+01:00 (CET)
  - Summer (DST): UTC+02:00 (CEST)
- INSEE/Postal code: 71187 /71210
- ^{1} French Land Register data, which excludes lakes, ponds, glaciers > 1 km^{2} (0.386 sq mi or 247 acres) and river estuaries.

Écuisses (French pronunciation: [ekɥis]) is a commune in the Saône-et-Loire department in the region of Bourgogne-Franche-Comté in eastern France. Le Creusot TGV station is located in the commune.

== See also ==
- Communes of the Saône-et-Loire department
