= TGV Haute-Picardie station =

Railway station in France

Haute-Picardie TGV
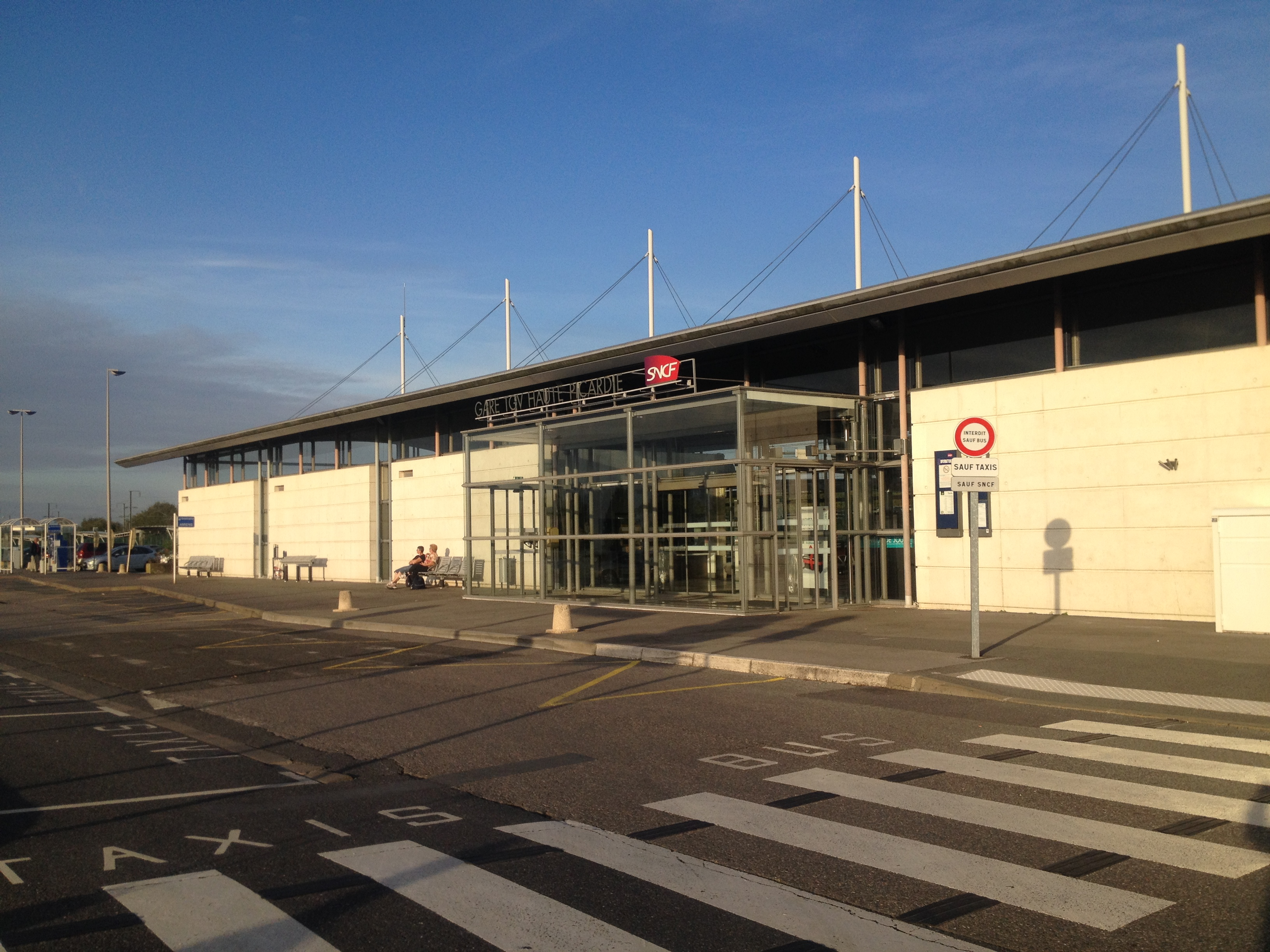
- The station entrance

General information
- Location: Ablaincourt-Pressoir; Somme, Picardy; France
- Coordinates: 49°51′33″N 2°49′54″E
- Elevation: 83 m (272 ft)
- Owner: SNCF
- Operator: SNCF
- Line: LGV Nord
- Platforms: 2
- Tracks: 4
- Train operators: TGV

Other information
- Station code: 87313882

History
- Opened: 3 July 1994

Passengers
- 2016: 324 016
Location
- Location within France

Haute-Picardie TGV station (French: Gare de TGV Haute-Picardie) is a railway station on the LGV Nord-Europe between Lille and Paris. Geographically, it is located about 10 km (6 mi) west of Péronne, between the towns of Saint Quentin and Amiens, in the heart of the Battle of the Somme territory.

== Overview ==
When built, it was criticised by the press for being too far from any of the neighbouring towns to be useful. It was located near a trunk road rather than a connecting railway line: it was often nicknamed la gare des betteraves, or 'sugar beet station', as it is surrounded by sugar beet fields, as it was the case for some rail stations in the countryside at the beginning of the twentieth century, when those vegetables were still transported almost exclusively by train to the nearest sugar refinery.

Today, the station is connected with the two local main cities, namely Amiens to the west and Saint Quentin to the east, by the A29 motorway – it takes around 30 minutes to reach either city and a bus shuttle service operates four times per day.

The annual number of passengers varies from 360,000 to 400,000.

As a very small TGV station, from the point of view of watching the trains the platform is only a few metres from the main running lines, where trains pass by at 300 km/h (190 mph), and there is a good view of the lines in both directions. At most stations on high-speed lines there is some form of barrier preventing this close up viewing from the platform. Since 2013, passengers are not allowed onto the platforms until the arrival of the next stopping train, in order to avoid any risk of being hit by flying track ballast.

There is a business park close to the station.

A TGV bound for Paris passes through the station, seen from the platform

Preceding station	SNCF	Following station
Arras towards	TGV inOui Brussels–Nice	Aéroport Charles de Gaulle towards
Arras towards	TGV inOui Lille-Europe–Marseille	Aéroport Charles de Gaulle towards
Arras towards	TGV inOui Lille-Europe–Montpellier	Aéroport Charles de Gaulle towards
Arras towards	TGV inOui Lille-Flandres–Bordeaux	Aéroport Charles de Gaulle towards
Arras towards	TGV inOui Lille-Flandres–Marseille	Aéroport Charles de Gaulle towards
Lille-Europe towards	TGV inOui Brussels–Nice	Aéroport Charles de Gaulle towards
Lille-Europe towards Brussels-South	TGV inOui	Aéroport Charles de Gaulle towards Marseille
Lille-Europe towards	TGV inOui Lille-Europe–Bordeaux	Aéroport Charles de Gaulle towards
Lille-Europe Terminus	TGV inOui	Aéroport Charles de Gaulle towards Bourg-Saint-Maurice
Lille-Europe towards	TGV inOui Lille-Europe–Marseille	Aéroport Charles de Gaulle towards
Lille-Europe towards	TGV inOui Lille-Europe–Montpellier	Aéroport Charles de Gaulle towards
Lille-Europe towards	TGV inOui Lille-Europe–Nantes	Aéroport Charles de Gaulle towards
Lille-Europe towards	TGV inOui Lille-Europe–Rennes	Aéroport Charles de Gaulle towards
Preceding station	Ouigo	Following station
Lille-Flandres Terminus	Ouigo	Aéroport Charles de Gaulle towards Marseille
Tourcoing Terminus	Ouigo	Aéroport Charles de Gaulle towards Bordeaux
