= Orry-la-Ville =

- Commune
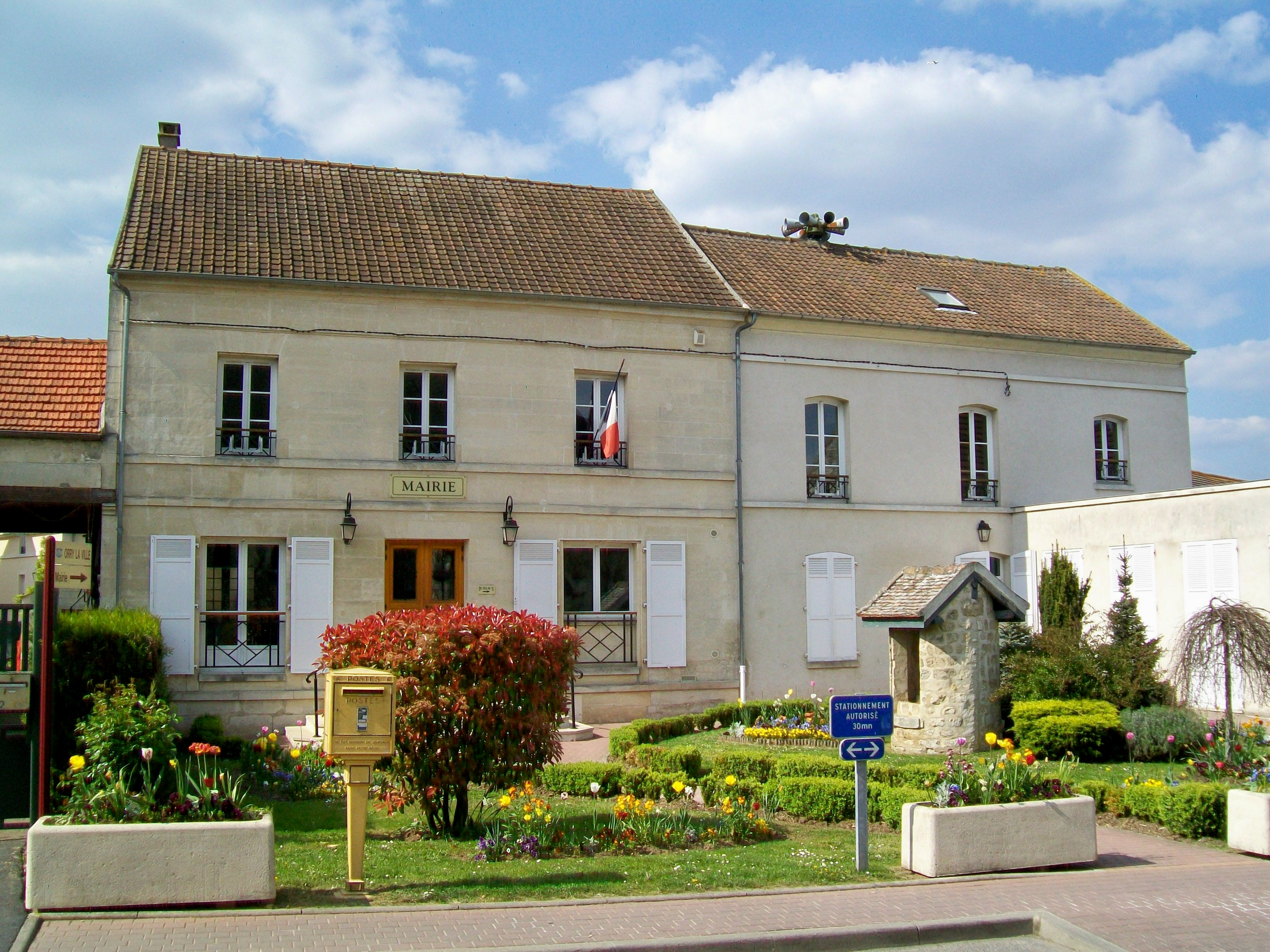
- Town hall

- Coat of arms
- Location of Orry-la-Ville
- Location within France Location within Hauts-de-France
- Coordinates: 49°07′59″N 2°30′49″E
- Country: France
- Region: Hauts-de-France
- Department: Oise
- Arrondissement: Senlis
- Canton: Senlis
- Intercommunality: CC de l'Aire Cantilienne

Government
  - Mayor (2020–2026): Nathanael Rosenfeld
- Area^{1}: 12.1 km^{2} (4.7 sq mi)
- Elevation: 95 m (312 ft)
- Highest elevation: 129 m (423 ft)
- Lowest elevation: 42 m (138 ft)
- Population (2023): 3,583
  - Density: 296/km^{2} (767/sq mi)
- Demonym: Orrygeois
- Time zone: UTC+01:00 (CET)
  - Summer (DST): UTC+02:00 (CEST)
- INSEE/Postal code: 60482 /60560
- Website: www.orrylaville.fr
- ^{1} French Land Register data, which excludes lakes, ponds, glaciers > 1 km^{2} (0.386 sq mi or 247 acres) and river estuaries.

Orry-la-Ville (French pronunciation: [ɔʁi la vil]; lit. 'Orry-the-City') is a commune in the Oise department in northern France. Orry-la-Ville-Coye station has rail connections to Amiens, Creil, Compiègne and Paris (at Gare du Nord).

== Population ==
Historical population
Year	Pop.	±% p.a.
1968	1,821	—
1975	2,604	+5.24%
1982	2,977	+1.93%
1990	3,159	+0.74%
1999	3,307	+0.51%
2007	3,255	−0.20%
2012	3,394	+0.84%
2017	3,345	−0.29%
2023	3,583	+1.15%
Source: INSEE

== See also ==
- Communes of the Oise department

== Gallery ==
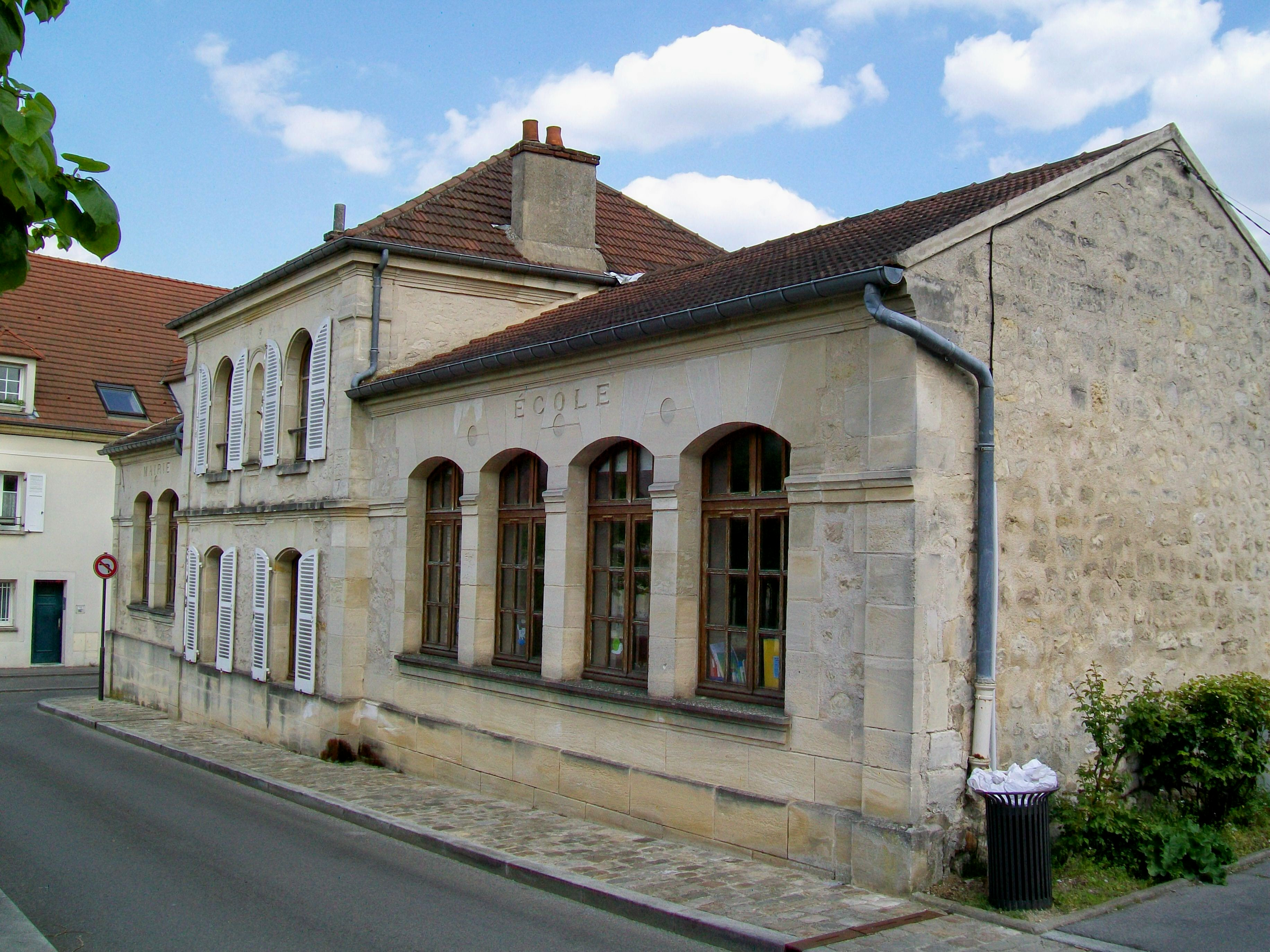
Former town hall-school in Orry-la-Ville

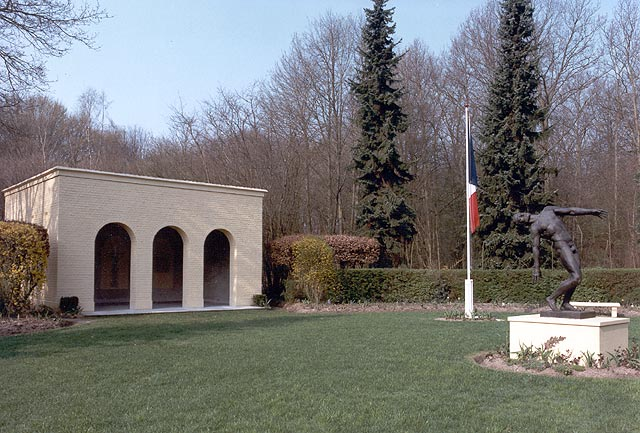
Dutch honorary cemetery in Orry-la-Ville
