= Antequera–Granada high-speed rail line =

High-speed railway line in Andalusia, Spain

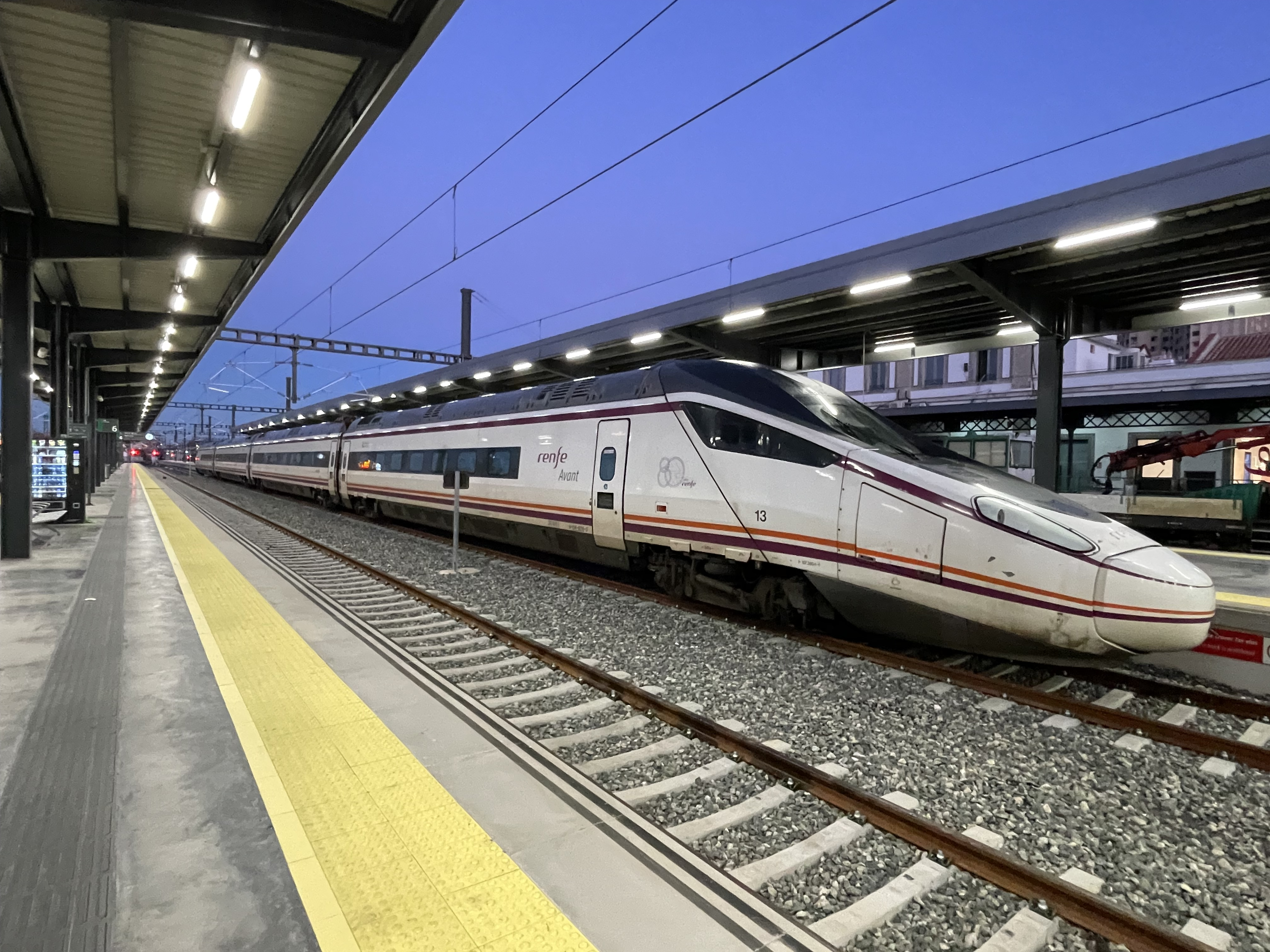
- A Renfe class 114 train at Granada railway station

Overview
- Status: Operational
- Owner: Adif
- Locale: Spain (Andalucia)
- Termini: Antequera-Santa Ana; Granada

Service
- Type: High-speed rail
- Operator(s): Renfe Operadora
- Ridership: 634,000 (2019-20)

History
- Opened: 26 June 2019

Technical
- Line length: 125.7 km (78.1 mi)
- Number of tracks: Double track
- Track gauge: Dual gauge (1,435 mm (4 ft 8 1/2 in) standard gauge 1,668 mm (5 ft 5 21/32 in)
- Electrification: 25 kV 50 Hz
- Operating speed: max 300 km/h (190 mph)

The Antequera–Granada high-speed rail line opened in 2019, linking the Spanish city of Granada to the AVE network via a branch from the existing Madrid–Málaga high-speed rail line at Antequera.

== Background ==
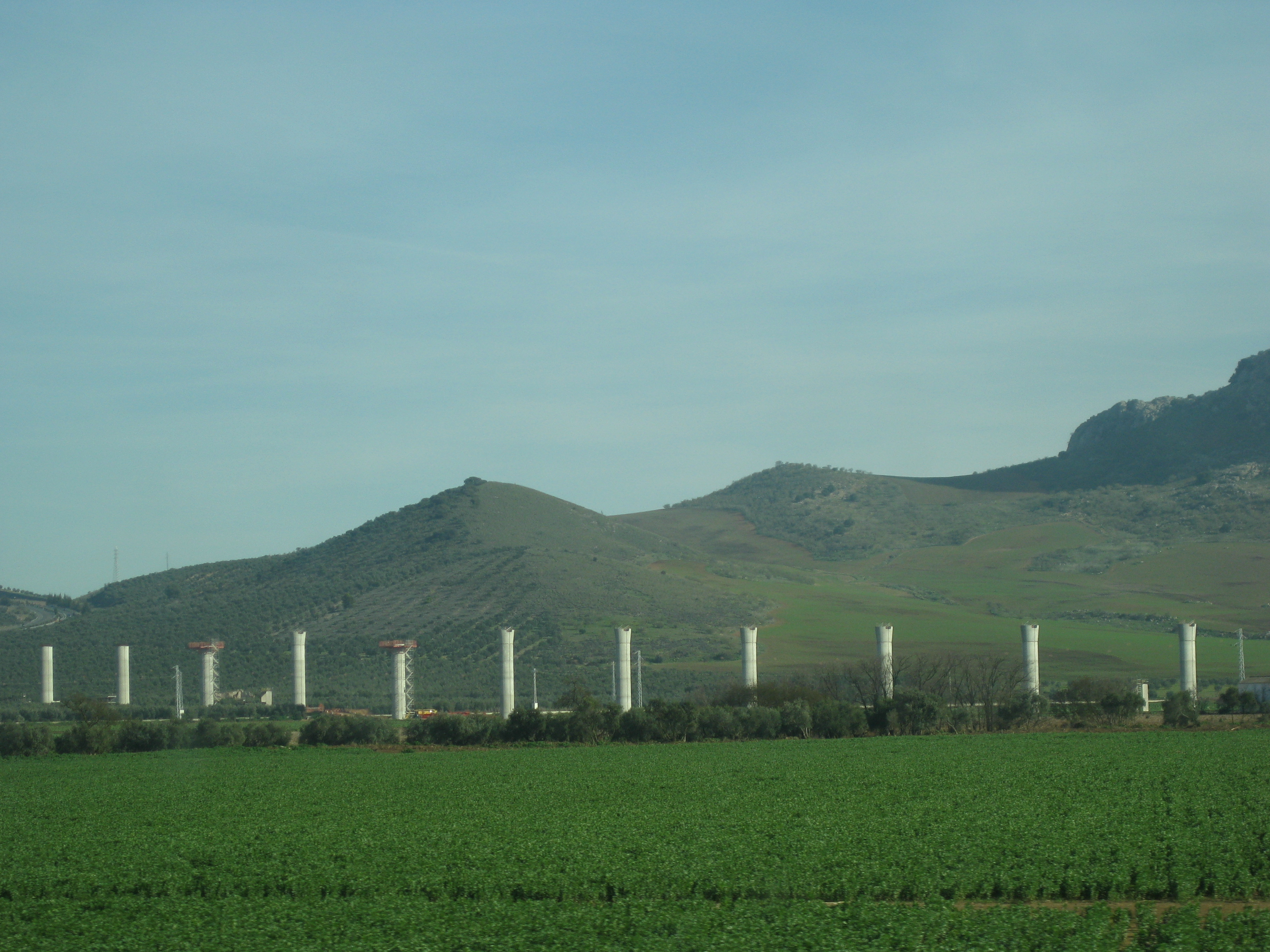
Construction on the line near Antequera in 2013

The 122.8 km (76.3 mi) line from Antequera to Granada is a part of the under construction Andalusian Transverse Axis high-speed rail line. The three times per day AVE service between Madrid Atocha and Granada covers the distance of 568 km (353 mi) in 3 h 5 min. The daily AVE train between Granada and Barcelona Sants connects the two cities in 6 h 25 min. S-102 and S-112 (Pato, max speed 330 km/h (210 mph)) trains are used for these services and all trains call at Córdoba, offering a journey time of 90 min from Granada. The total cost of building the line was €1.4 billion.

== Stations ==
After branching from the existing Antequera-Santa Ana railway station, the line serves Loja and Granada. In 2019, construction was set to begin on a €16 million underground AVE station in Antequera town centre, making Antequera the only city in Spain outside of Madrid to have two high-speed rail stops.

== Services ==
The line is used by AVE services to Madrid and one daily service to Barcelona. In November 2019, a daily patronage of 2,600 passengers using these services was reported. Since December 2024 a daily Alvia service Madrid-Almeria via Granada on S-730 trains is using the line In addition medium distance high speed Avant services connect Granada to Málaga and to Seville on trains calling at Loja and Antequera-Santa Ana.
