= Puente Genil-Herrera railway station =

Puente Genil-Herrera
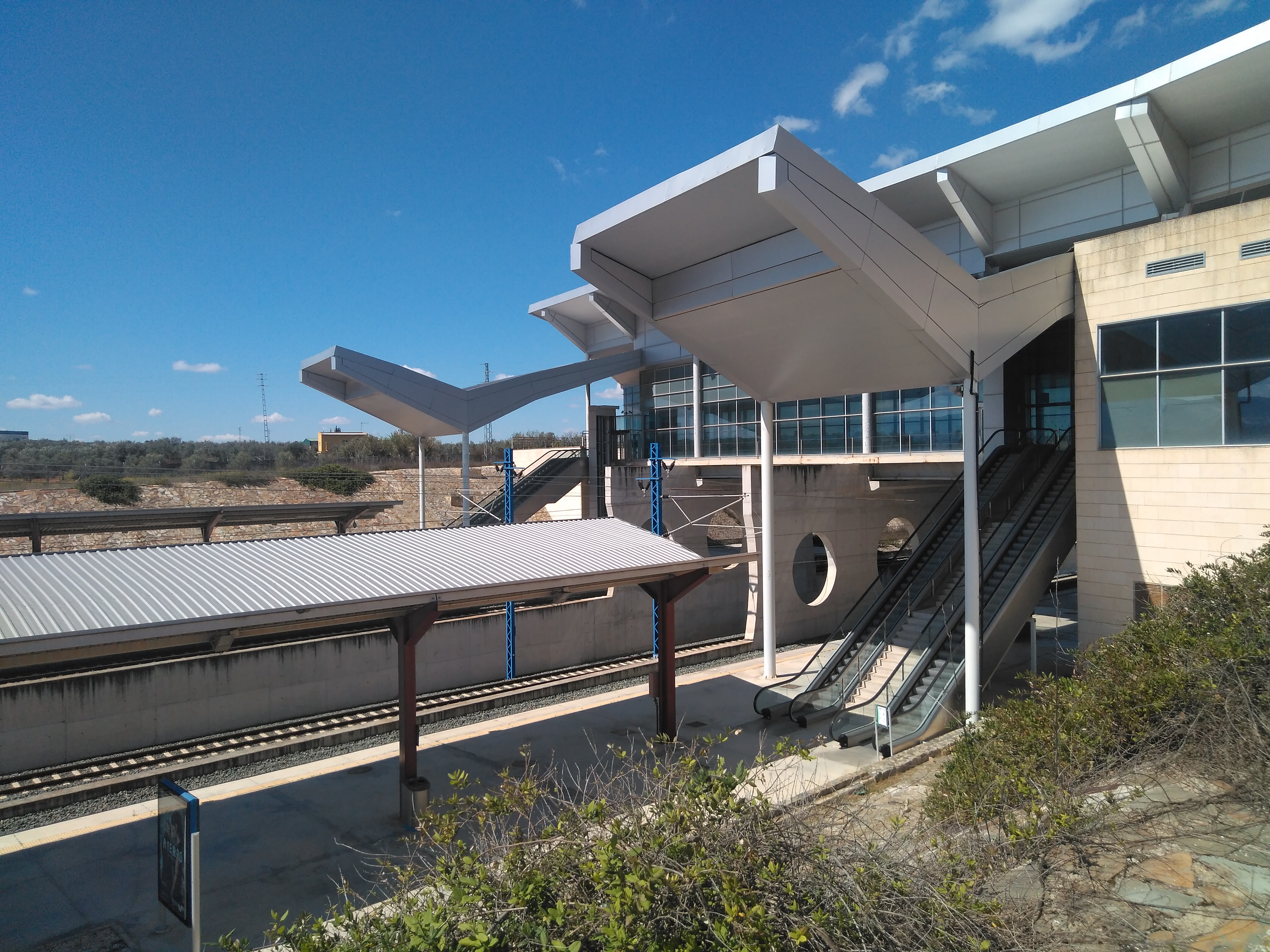
- The station in 2021.

General information
- Coordinates: 37.3597°N 4.8222°W
- Owner: Adif
- Operator: Renfe
- Line: Madrid–Málaga high-speed rail line

History
- Opened: 2006

Passengers
- 2018: 139,376
Location

Puente Genil-Herrera railway station is a railway station serving the Spanish towns of Puente Genil, Córdoba and Herrera, Seville in Andalusia. It is served by the Spanish AVE high-speed rail system, on the Madrid–Málaga high-speed rail line.

== History ==
The station was built in 2006 at a cost of €7.2 million. It has been since one of the least-used stations on the entire high-speed network, with 69 passengers a day in 2016.

Preceding station	Renfe Operadora	Following station
Córdoba towards Madrid Atocha	AVE	Antequera-Santa Ana towards Málaga María Zambrano
Córdoba towards Barcelona Sants	AVE	Antequera-Santa Ana towards Málaga María Zambrano
Córdoba towards Madrid Atocha	AVE	Antequera-Santa Ana towards Granada
Córdoba towards Barcelona-Sants	AVE	Antequera-Santa Ana towards Granada
Córdoba towards Seville-Santa Justa	Avant	Antequera-Santa Ana towards Málaga María Zambrano
