= Diurno (train) =

Brand of passenger trains in Spain, 1990–2012

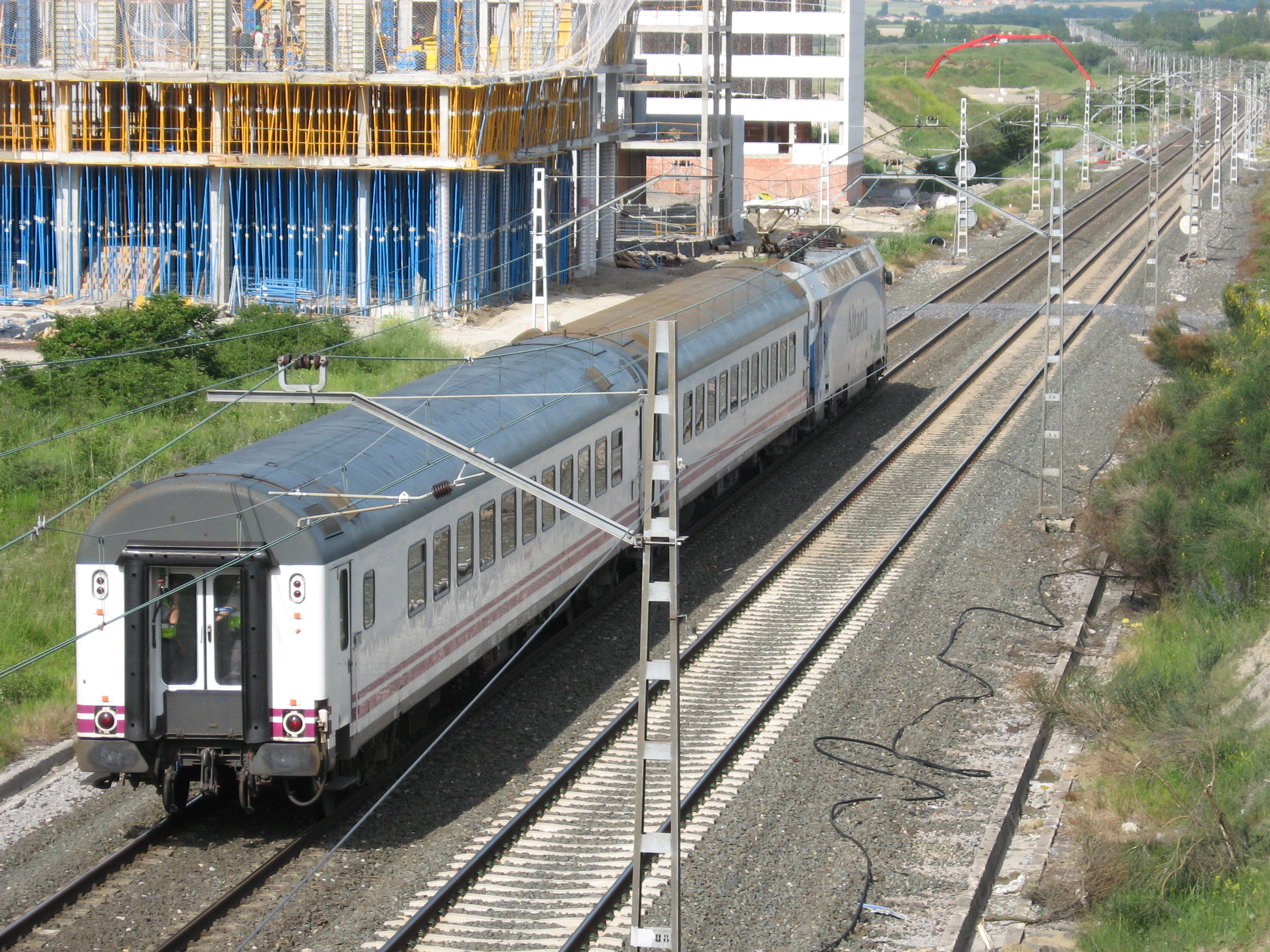
- Diurno 280, Galicia-Basque Country, leaving Vitoria for Irún
- Established: 1990
- Defunct: 2012
- Type: Brand
- Parent organisation: RENFE Operadora

Diurno was the brand name used by RENFE for long-distance semifast passenger trains on the Spanish broad-gauge conventional railway network between 1990 and 2012, replacing the previous Rápido designation. These trains served routes longer than 500 kilometers with journey times of between 6 and 10 hours, and stopped at most stations, completing RENFE's passenger rail offerings by providing affordable direct service between small towns and distant major cities.

== History ==
Between 1990 and 1991, RENFE introduced the Diurno brand to replace the earlier Rápido category of trains, with most Rápidos being renamed Diurnos with little change in composition or service. Conventional locomotives and carriages were used for versatility, with the service Diurno García Lorca leaving Barcelona-Sants as a single consist and splitting into smaller trains that continued to Badajoz, Granada, Almería, Málaga-María Zambrano and Sevilla-Santa Justa.

These trains suffered a decline in number, capacity, and onboard service levels throughout the 1990s and 2000s. Although occasionally used in later years as a budget alternative to the AVE for intercity travel (a role also and still currently filled by RENFE Intercity trains), their main purpose remained the connection of rural communities and major cities, leading to pushback from residents upon their discontinuation. In spite of this, the final Diurno, linking Salamanca to the Basque Country, was discontinued with the 17 June 2012 timetable change, being replaced by a regional train service requiring a transfer in Valladolid.

== See also ==
- Arco (train)
- Altaria
- Alaris
- Intercity (RENFE)
- Talgo (train service)
- RENFE Class 9000
- RENFE Class 1000
- RENFE Class 12000
- RENFE Class 16200
- RENFE Class 16300
