= Madrid–Seville high-speed rail line =

High-speed railway line in Spain

- Madrid–Seville line in red

Overview
- Status: Operational
- Owner: Adif
- Locale: Spain: Community of Madrid; Castilla–La Mancha; Andalusia
- Termini: Madrid–Puerta de Atocha; Seville–Santa Justa

Service
- Type: High-speed rail
- Operator: Renfe
- Ridership: 3,481,000 (2018)

History
- Opened: 14 April 1992

Technical
- Line length: 471.8 km (293.2 mi)
- Num of tracks: 2
- Track gauge: 1,435 mm (4 ft 8 1/2 in) standard gauge
- Minimum radius: Standard: 4,000 m (13,000 ft); Absolute: 3,250 m (10,660 ft)
- Electrification: Overhead line, 25 kV 50 Hz AC
- Maximum incline: Standard: 12.5 ‰; Absolute: 13.25 ‰

The Madrid–Seville high-speed line (Spanish: Nuevo Acceso Ferroviario a Andalucía) is a 472-kilometer-long (293 mi) railway line for high-speed traffic between Madrid and Seville in Spain. The first Spanish high-speed rail connection has been in use since 21 April 1992 at speeds up to 300 km/h (186 mph). Travel time between the two end points was reduced by over half.

At Córdoba the Madrid–Málaga high-speed rail line leaves the line from Madrid. At Seville the line is extended to Cádiz only for the Alvia service.

== Routing ==
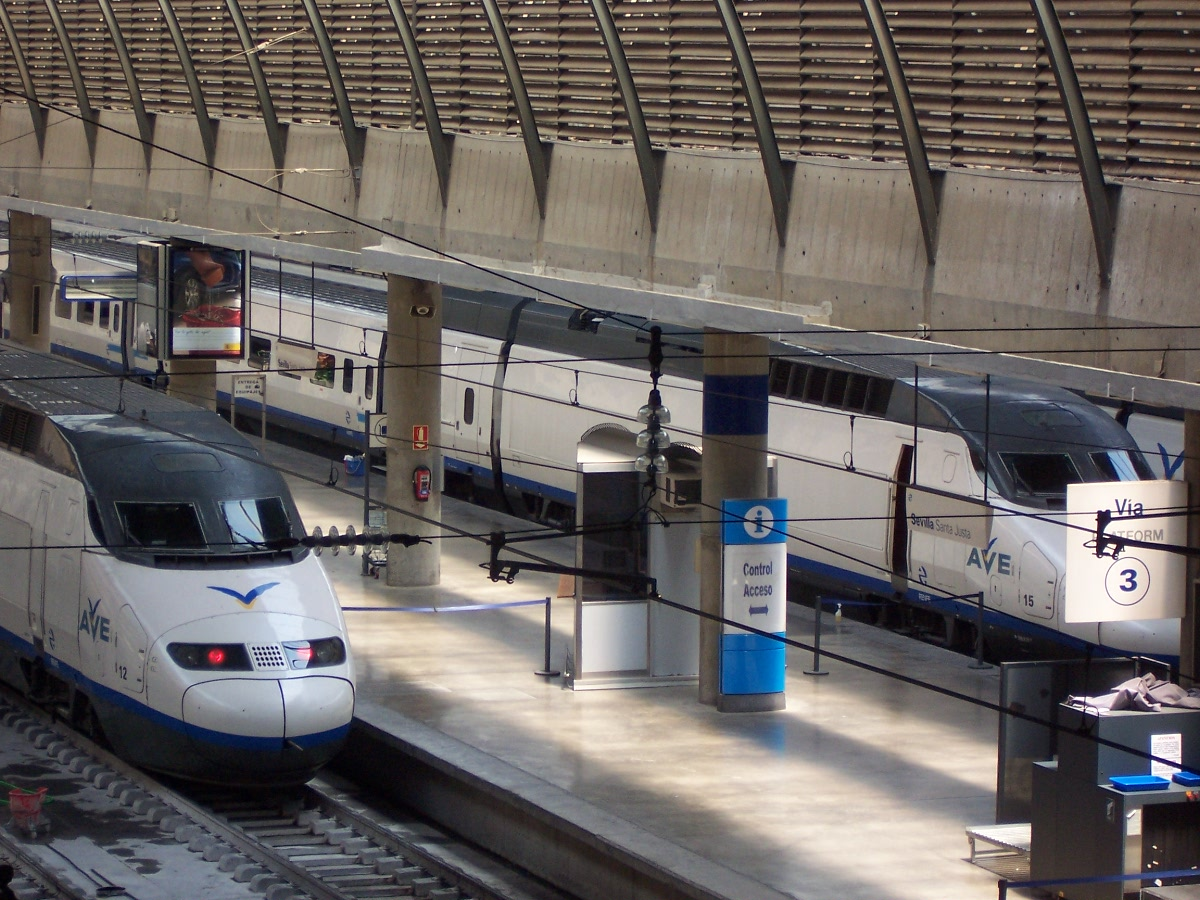
AVEs in Seville's Santa Justa station.

The line starts at Madrid-Atocha and runs over 31 bridges (total length 9,845 meters (32,300 ft)) and through 17 tunnels (total length 16.03 kilometers (9.96 mi), crossing the plains of the southern half of the Inner Plateau. It climbs south of Toledo as well as when crossing the Sierra Morena to an altitude of 800 metres (2,600 ft), and then descends to around sea level as it approaches Seville. The terminus of the line is the railway station Santa Justa in Seville.

== Technical details ==
The high-speed line was constructed at standard gauge, in contrast with the rest of the Spanish railway network. Voltage is 25 kV AC instead of 3000 V DC. Twelve transformers feed the overhead wires. Some 8 kilometers (5.0 mi) before the start and end points of the line, the line merges with local DC tracks.

The line was equipped with signalling standards that had been developed in the 80s for the German Hanover-Würzburg high-speed rail line and the Mannheim-Stuttgart high-speed rail line.

At the end of 2006, Spanish governmental agency ADIF ordered technical changes to the safety systems along the line for an amount of €12.6 million, so that in the future, trains of the Renfe-type 104 will be able to run at 200 km/h (124 mph) instead of 180 km/h (112 mph). A further amount of €4.1 million has been spent on changes to the ASFA train safety system.

Between the railway stations along the line, passing stations and emergency stations are located (in Spanish: Puesto de adelantamiento y estacionamiento de trenes, abbr. PAET). These allow faster trains to overtake slower trains, and the parking of rescue trains. In addition, most of these stations have basic platforms that can be used to let passengers descend and change to buses in case of emergency.

Trains travel along the line at 300 km/h (186 mph) during the sections of the track close to Madrid. They travel at 200 km/h (124 mph) through the Sierra Morena region, possibly because the S/100 trains aren't pressure-sealed and this section includes many tunnels and also because of the tight curvatures in the Sierra Morena (occasionally dipping as low as 2,300 m (7,500 ft)). According to the HS2 website, a 200 km/h (124 mph) track needs a curvature of 1,800 m (5,900 ft) and a 400 km/h (249 mph) track needs a curvature of 7,200 m (23,600 ft). As the necessary curvature increases in proportion to the square of the maximum velocity, the maximum safe speed for a curvature of 2,300 m (7,500 ft) would be 226 km/h (140 mph), assuming no tilting technology: - only the AVE Class 100, AVE Class 102 and AVE Class 103 run through the Sierra Morena section, of which only the AVE Class 102 has tilting technology. The trains travel at a top speed of 250 km/h (155 mph) between Córdoba and Seville, possibly on account of the Avant services that also use the line, whose trains are limited to 250 km/h (155 mph). On most journeys, the trains spend a very small proportion of the journey travelling above 250 km/h (155 mph), although most of the Málaga branch is done at 300 km/h (186 mph) (save for station approaches and the Gobantes and Abdalajís tunnels). The trains slow down to approximately 160 km/h (99 mph) when travelling through Ciudad Real station. They also have to slow down to 70 km/h (43 mph) when travelling through Puertollano station because of the lack of a bypass route and tight curvatures in the station.

== History ==
AVE lines in Andalusia, including the later branch to Malaga.

On 11 October 1986 the Spanish government decided to build a new railway between Madrid and Seville. On 25 February 1988, the international tender for the acquisition of 24 high-speed trains AVE followed; these trains were ordered by 23 December 1988. The first train, based on the third generation of TGVs, was delivered on 10 October 1991.

In December 1988 it was decided to build the new line in standard gauge. Construction was ordered on 16 March 1989, and it lasted for 33 months; actual construction activity lasted only 24 months. Commercial use of the line commenced on 21 April 1992 in time for the Seville Expo '92 opened on 20 April. The AVE high-speed service was introduced for first time on the 476 km long Madrid–Seville route on S-100 trains capable to reach speeds up to 300 km/h and traveling at more than 250 km/h. Non-stop travel time between the two cities were 2:45 hrs; with stops at Ciudad Real, Puertollano and Córdoba it was 2:55 hrs. In the first weeks, over 23 thousand passengers used the new trains - an occupancy rate of 81%.

Six months later a high-speed shuttle service between Madrid, Ciudad Real and Puertollano was introduced called AVE Lanzadera, which was later renamed to Avant.

In 1994 trains in commercial service reached 300 km/h for the first time and travel time between Madrid and Seville was reduced down to 2 hours and 20 minutes.

The new railway line radically changed the modal split between Madrid and Seville. The share of air traffic decreased between 1991 and 1994 from 40% to 13%; the combined share of car and bus decreased from 44% to 36%. The share of railway traffic increased from 16% to 51%, while total traffic increased by 35%.

In 1997 a request to the president of Renfe by the Malagón City Council and the Ciudad Real Provincial Council to reopen the station in Malagón, which was closed during construction of the Madrid-Seville high-speed line, was denied.

In 1997, some 4.4 million passengers travelled along the line; in 1998, 4.75 million. By 1999, trains transported over 4 times as many passengers as planes between Seville and Madrid.

In 2004 Renfe launched a new Avant service on the Córdoba - Seville section on trains designed specifically to cover medium-distance routes at a maximum speed of 250 km/h.

In 2014, a new station was added in Villanueva de Córdoba, between Córdoba and Puertollano, to improve accessibility of the Los Pedroches region.

The line later received branches in Andalusia. In October 2015 an extension of the Madrid-Seville high-speed rail line to Cádiz railway station was completed after 14 years of works and put in service by Alvia trains for speeds up to 200 km/h (124 mph). This section is built on Iberian gauge track. With less stops between Seville and Cádiz and with possible installation of ERTMS (European Rail Traffic Management System) railway signaling in the line, the maximum speed for the trains can be raised up to 250 km/h. In that case AVE services to Cádiz on dual-gauge Class 106 trains could be possible.

In May 2025, four segments of a cable used in the railway's signaling system were stolen in Toledo, causing extensive travel disruptions.

== Accidents and incidents ==
- On 18 January 2026, a train derailed near Adamuz, crossing onto the opposite track and crashing into an oncoming train. 46 people were killed and 292 were injured. The likely cause was identified as improper kit usage on a rail weld, with wear and tear leading to the rail breakage sticking up; after nearly a month of repairs, the line reopened on 17 February.
- On 28 October 2026, two trains collided in Urda, Toledo, killing at least 69 people, when a AVE train ran into the back of a stationary Iryo train.

== Sources ==
- Hochgeschwindigkeitsverkehr in Spanien aufgenommen and Neubaustrecke Madrid–Sevilla in Betrieb, in: Eisenbahntechnische Rundschau, June 1992, page 354 f. (in German)
