= Madrid–Málaga high-speed rail line =

Railway line in Spain

- Madrid-Málaga high speed rail line in red

Overview
- Status: Operational
- Owner: Adif
- Locale: Spain (Community of Madrid, Andalucia)
- Termini: Madrid Puerta de Atocha; Málaga María Zambrano

Service
- Type: High-speed rail
- Operator(s): Renfe Operadora
- Rolling stock: 100, 104 and 112
- Ridership: 2,526,000 (2018)

History
- Opened: December 2007 (Córdoba-Málaga)

Technical
- Line length: 512.5 km (318.5 mi)
- Number of tracks: Double track
- Track gauge: 1,435 mm (4 ft 8 1/2 in) standard gauge
- Electrification: 25 kV 50 Hz

The Madrid–Málaga high-speed rail line is a standard gauge High-speed rail line of 512 km (318 mi) in length that links the city of Madrid with the city of Málaga in Spain. The line was inaugurated on 24 December 2007. At the time the service opened, Renfe Operadora was running 22 trains daily between Madrid and Málaga.

== History ==
The first high-speed rail line in Spain was opened in 1992 when Madrid–Seville high-speed rail line was inaugurated as a part of the NAFA project (Nuevo Acceso Ferroviario a Andalucía, New Rail Access to Andalusia). In January 1993 the Talgo 200 Madrid–Málaga service began, using AVE lines as far as Córdoba and then Spanish-gauge conventional track to reach Málaga. The new high-speed section from Córdoba to Málaga, which is considered as a part of the New Rail Access to Andalusia, was projected in 1999 and integrated into the PEIT (Strategic Infrastructure Plan of the Ministry of Development, 2005-2020) with an estimated investment of €2.1 billion. Construction and operation were entrusted to Adif. The first 100 km (62 mi) of the new section between Córdoba and Antequera-Santa Ana was put in service on 16 December 2006. The line was completed on 23 December 2007 reaching the city of Málaga and the new station Málaga María Zambrano.

== Line ==
The line is built to standard gauge supporting compatibility with neighbouring countries' rail systems and is designed for speeds of 300 km/h (186 mph). It connects the cities of Madrid, Córdoba and Málaga, and also includes stops at Puente Genil and Antequera in Andalusia, Spain. For the part between Madrid and Córdoba the line shares a common section with the Madrid–Seville high-speed rail line inaugurated in 1992. Outside Córdoba a 155 km (96 mi) spur railway branches off towards Málaga (the total distance between Córdoba and Málaga on the line is 170 km (110 mi)).

== Route ==
The stations along the line are Madrid Atocha railway station, Córdoba Central, Puente Genil-Herrera, Antequera-Santa Ana and Málaga María Zambrano. The 122 km (76 mi) high-speed line towards Granada starting at Antequera was inaugurated in June 2019.

The line runs along a double track section in the few kilometres after Córdoba Central and later becomes quadruple track. Eventually, just outside a town called Los Mochos (a few kilometres east-north-east of Almodóvar del Río), the Seville and Málaga branches become separate. The line takes a different route to the existing slower single-track line, but starts to run parallel to it between the towns of Doñana and Santa Rosalia Maqueda, running alongside it for the rest of the journey to Málaga-María Zambrano station.

The section between Córdoba and Málaga runs through precipitous terrain in the Sierra Nevada and several viaducts and tunnels were necessary to complete the connections, including the Guadalhorce viaduct (574 m (1,883 ft)), the Abdalajís Tunnel (the 3rd longest in Spain after the Guadarrama and Pajares tunnels at 8,970 m (29,430 ft) in the Cordillera Bética), the Arroyo de las Piedras viaduct (1,208 m (3,963 ft) long and 93.4 m (306 ft) high, making it the highest viaduct along the line), the Arroyo del Espinazo and Jévar viaducts (the longest viaduct along the line when the two are considered together) and the Álora, Espartal, Tevilla, Gibralmora and Cártama tunnels that exist in a long chain. The precipitous terrain is one possible reason why the Córdoba–Seville section was opened in 1992, but the Córdoba–Málaga section wasn't opened until December 2007.

== Services ==
The AVE service (using the AVE Class 102) offers Madrid–Málaga journey times of 2 hours and 20 minutes with direct services. The average speed of 220 km/h (137 mph) for this journey is not particularly high (the fastest Madrid–Barcelona journey is 2 hours and 30 minutes over 621 km (386 mi), giving an average speed of 257 km/h (160 mph)): - trains are restricted to 200 km/h (124 mph) in the Sierra Morena (here, the curvature drops as low as 2,300 m (7,546 ft), meaning the maximum safe speed without tilting technology is approximately 226 km/h (140 mph), as a curvature of at least 1,800 m (5,906 ft) is needed for 200 km/h (124 mph) and 7,200 m (23,622 ft) for 400 km/h (249 mph) ). The trains also slow down to 160 km/h (99 mph) for the Abdalajís and Gobantes tunnels, even though the tunnel radii are high enough to support 300 km/h (186 mph).

Two low cost Avlo high speed services per day are also offered by Renfe on the Madrid–Málaga route on 438 seat S-112 trains (Pato, max speed 330 km/h (205 mph)) calling at all intermediate stations. The line is also used by the Iryo Madrid–Málaga service calling at Córdoba station.

Direct Barcelona–Málaga AVE services are also offered by combining the Madrid-Málaga line and Madrid–Barcelona high-speed rail line on the same route. S-112 trains are used for these services and cover the distance between Barcelona and Málaga in 5 hours and 50 minutes without making a stop in Madrid but with additional intermediate stops at Camp de Tarragona, Lleida Pirineus and Zaragoza-Delicias.

The Avant services transport passengers directly from Seville to Málaga and vice versa, with intermediate stops at Córdoba, Puente Genil-Herrera and Antequera-Santa Ana stations and between Málaga and Granada calling at Antequera-Santa Ana.

== See also ==
- High-speed rail in Spain
- Madrid–Seville high-speed rail line
- Madrid–Barcelona high-speed rail line
- AVE Class 103
- AVE
- Córdoba, Spain
- Málaga
