= Antequera-Santa Ana railway station =

Railway station in Antequera, Spain

Antequera-Santa Ana
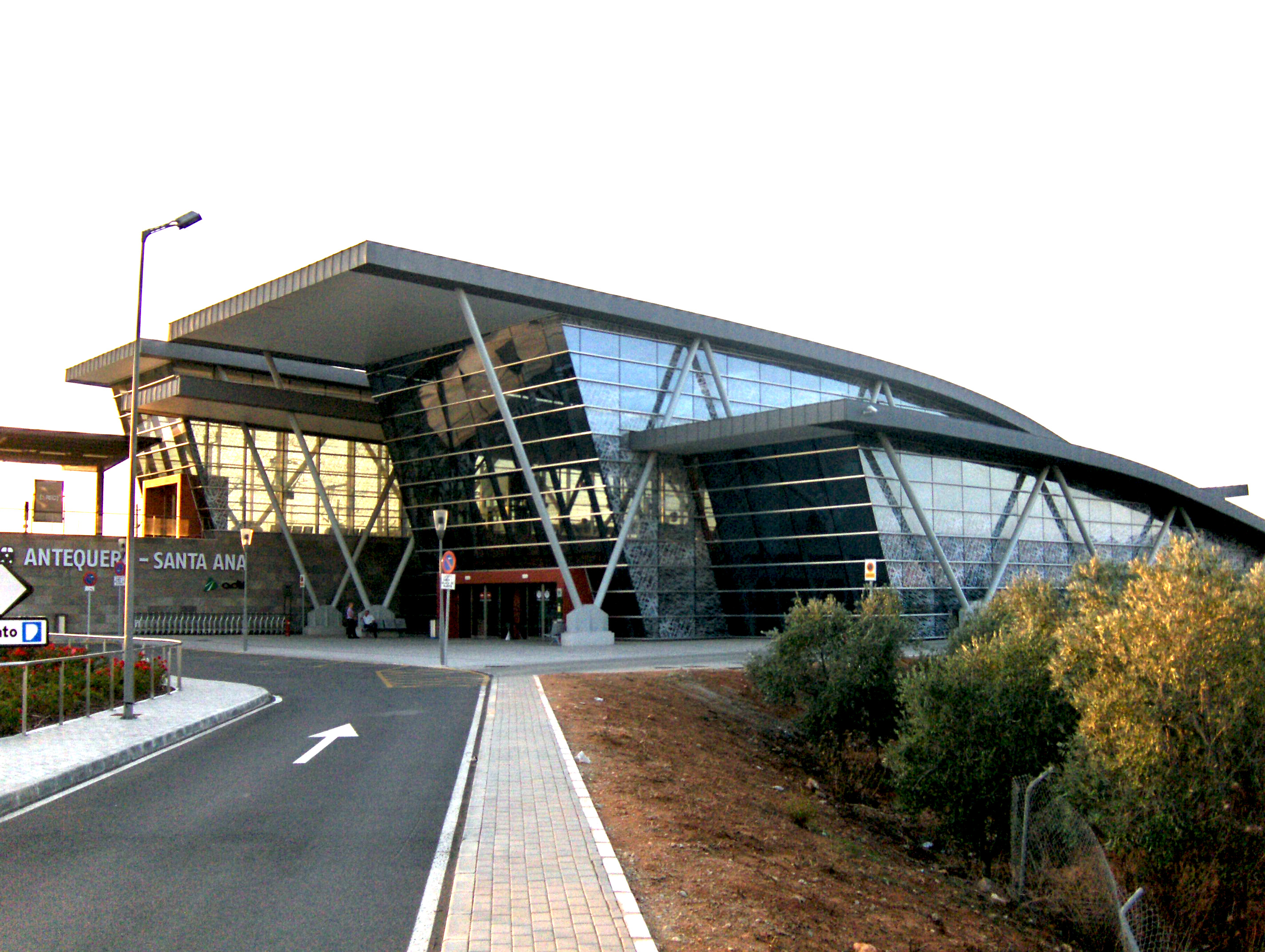
- Station building

General information
- Coordinates: 37.0702°N 4.7192°W
- Owner: Adif
- Operator: Renfe
- Lines: Madrid–Málaga high-speed rail line; Antequera–Granada high-speed rail line

Passengers
- 2024: 551,527
Location

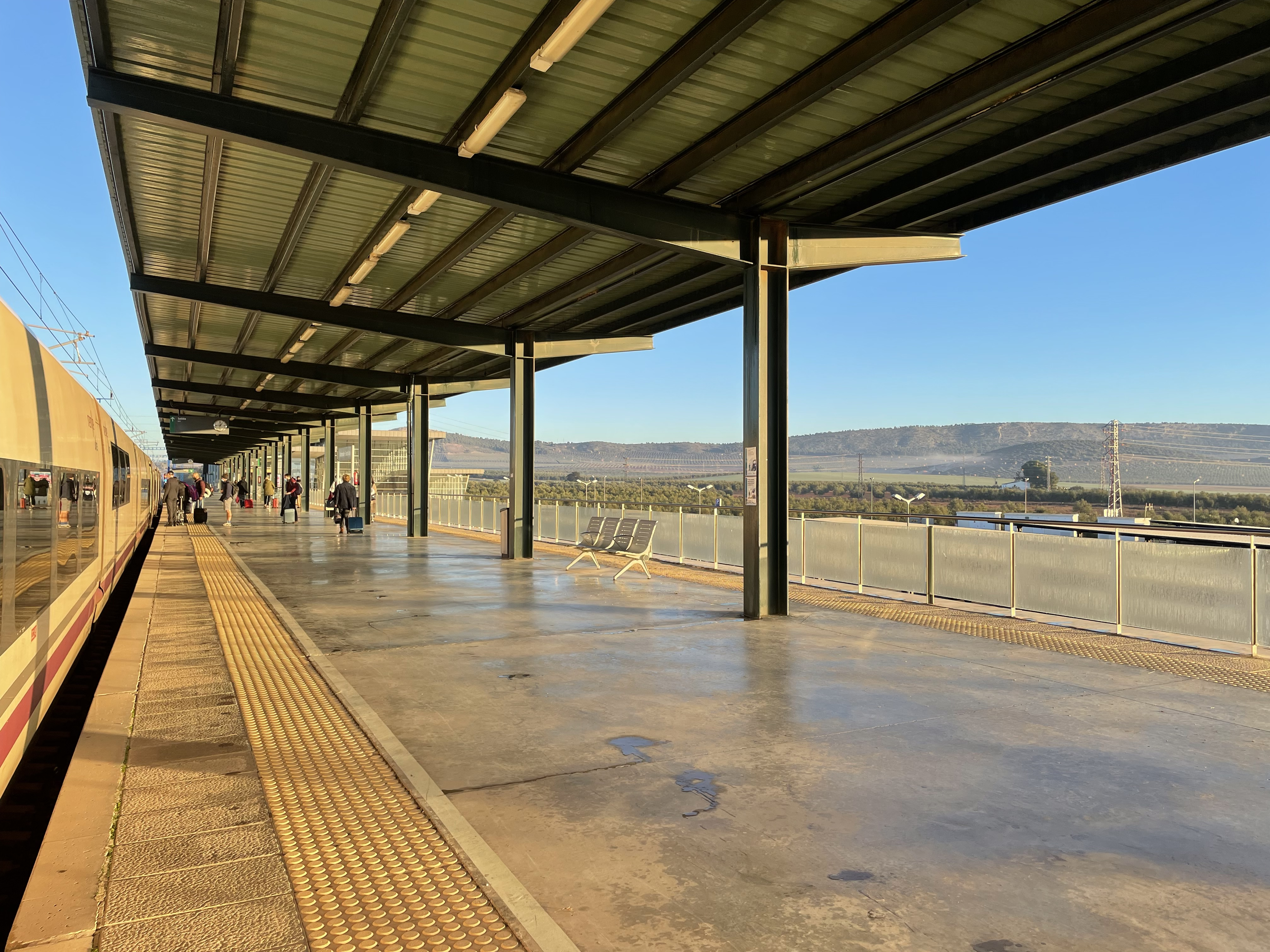
Station platform

Antequera-Santa Ana railway station is a railway station at a railway junction near the Spanish town of Antequera, Málaga in Andalusia. It is located 17 kilometres (11 mi) from the town centre. It was created principally to serve passengers on the developing AVE high-speed rail system. However, the station has access to Iberian gauge lines for conventional services.

== High-speed services ==
It serves passengers using the Madrid–Málaga high-speed rail line and the Antequera-Granada high-speed rail line.

== Conventional services ==
A gauge changer exists near the station, allowing trains to operate seamlessly on both standard gauge AVE tracks and Iberian gauge tracks. Antequera-Santa Ana is served by Media Distancia trains to Algeciras, Almería and Seville-Santa Justa.

== History ==
The station was opened in 2006, originally as a terminus on the then-incomplete Córdoba–Málaga branch of the Spanish AVE high-speed rail system. The AVE reached Málaga in 2007. In 2019, the Antequera–Granada high-speed rail line opened, providing AVE service to Granada. Also in 2019, Adif began works to improve the lighting surrounding the station at a cost of €38,000.

Preceding station	Renfe Operadora	Following station
Puente Genil-Herrera towards Madrid Atocha	AVE	Málaga María Zambrano Terminus
Puente Genil-Herrera towards Barcelona Sants	AVE	Málaga María Zambrano Terminus
Puente Genil-Herrera towards Madrid Atocha	AVE	Granada Terminus
Puente Genil-Herrera towards Barcelona Sants	AVE	Granada Terminus
Córdoba towards Madrid Puerta de Atocha	Intercity	Ronda towards Algeciras
Pedrera towards Seville-Santa Justa	Media Distancia	Antequera-Ciudad towards Almería
Antequera-Ciudad towards Granada	Media Distancia	Bobadilla towards Algeciras
Puente Genil-Herrera towards Seville-Santa Justa	Avant	Málaga María Zambrano Terminus
