= Córdoba railway station =

Railway station in Spain

Córdoba Central
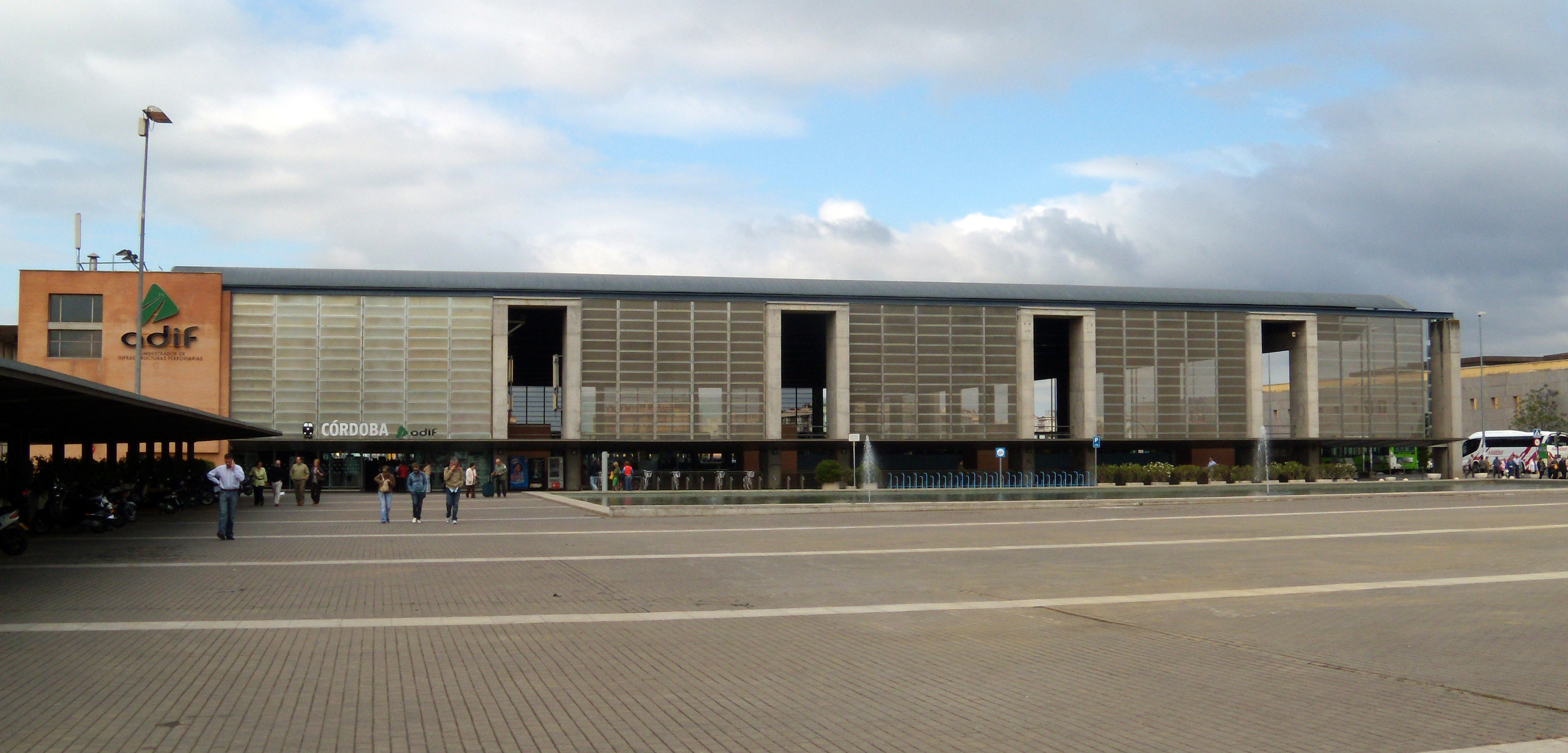
- Station building

General information
- Location: Córdoba, Andalusia, Spain
- Coordinates: 37.8885°N 4.7896°W
- Owner: Adif
- Operator: Renfe
- Lines: Madrid–Seville high-speed rail line; Madrid–Málaga high-speed rail line; Alcázar de San Juan–Cádiz; Córdoba–Málaga railway
- Platforms: 5

Other information
- IATA code: XOJ

History
- Opened: 9 September 1994

Passengers
- 2024: 5,732,927
- Rank: 48 (2018)
Location

Córdoba railway station, also known as Córdoba Central, is the main railway station of the Spanish city of Córdoba, Andalusia. It was opened in 1994 replacing an older station.

== Services ==
Córdoba is an important junction in the Spanish rail network, serving three AVE high-speed rail lines, connecting Madrid Atocha with Málaga, Seville and Granada; and conventional Iberian gauge lines hosting various medium and long distance services. Trains passing through Córdoba also connect to Cádiz, Barcelona Sants and Jaén.

| Preceding station | Renfe Operadora | Following station |
|---|---|---|
| Puertollano towards Madrid Puerta de Atocha | AVE | Seville-Santa Justa Terminus |
| Puertollano towards Madrid Puerta de Atocha | AVE | Puente Genil-Herrera towards Málaga María Zambrano |
| Puertollano towards Madrid Puerta de Atocha | AVE | Puente Genil-Herrera towards Granada |
| Puertollano towards Valencia-Joaquín Sorolla | AVE | Seville-Santa Justa Terminus |
| Puertollano towards Barcelona Sants | AVE | Seville-Santa Justa Terminus |
| Ciudad Real towards Barcelona Sants | AVE | Puente Genil-Herrera towards Málaga María Zambrano |
| Puertollano towards Madrid Puerta de Atocha | Alvia | Seville-Santa Justa towards Cádiz |
| Puertollano towards Santander | Alvia | Seville-Santa Justa towards Cádiz |
| Puertollano towards Gijón | Alvia | Seville-Santa Justa towards Cádiz |
| Madrid Puerta de Atocha Terminus | Alvia | La Palma del Condado towards Huelva |
| Villanueva de Córdoba-Los Pedroches towards Madrid Puerta de Atocha | Intercity | Antequera-Santa Ana towards Algeciras |
| Andújar towards Barcelona Sants | Intercity | Seville-Santa Justa Terminus |
| Posadas towards Seville-Santa Justa | Media Distancia 66 | Villa del Río towards Jaén |
| Terminus | Media Distancia 69 | Montilla towards Bobadilla |
| El Higuerón towards Villarrubia de Córdoba | Media Distancia 75 | Rabanales towards Alcolea de Córdoba |
| Seville-Santa Justa towards Cádiz | Avant 76 | Villa del Río towards Jaén |
| Seville-Santa Justa Terminus | Avant 84 | Puente Genil-Herrera towards Málaga María Zambrano |
