= Puente Genil =

- Municipality
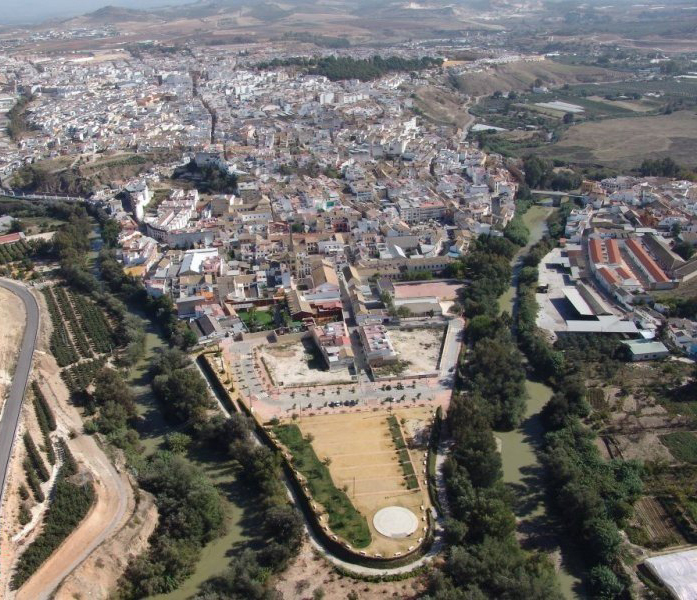

- Coat of arms

- Location in Spain
- Coordinates: 37°23′0″N 4°46′0″W
- Country: Spain
- Autonomous community: Andalusia
- Province: Córdoba

Area
  - Total: 171.05 km^{2} (66.04 sq mi)
- Elevation: 217 m (712 ft)

Population (2025-01-01)
  - Total: 29,963
  - Density: 175.17/km^{2} (453.69/sq mi)
- Demonym(s): Pontanés/a, pontano/a, pontanense
- Time zone: UTC+1 (CET)
  - Summer (DST): UTC+2 (CEST)
- Postal code: 14500
- Website: Official website

Puente Genil (Spanish pronunciation: [ˈpwente xeˈnil]) is a Spanish municipality in the province of Córdoba, autonomous community of Andalusia. It is situated about 45 miles (70 km) from the provincial capital, Córdoba. It has a population of around 30,000.

== Geography ==
The municipality largely features a gentle relief, interrupted by the Sierra del Castillo, Sierra Gorda, and Sierra del Niño hill ranges. At 511 metres above sea level, Peñarrubia (in Sierra del Castillo) is the highest point in the municipality. The river Genil crosses the municipality from southeast to northwest. The urban development straddles the river, with the neighborhood of Miragenil standing on the opposite bank relative to the bulk of housing.

== History ==
The municipal limits attest to Roman occupation in the site of Fuente Álamo (to the NE of the current housing), including a balneum from the Julio-Claudian period and a villa from the Low Roman Empire. The area belonged to the Conventus Iuridicus Astigitanus.

Both Pontón de Don Gonzalo (a.k.a. La Puente de Don Gonzalo) and Miragenil were 13th-century Christian establishments. Pontón de Don Gonzalo was first mentioned in a 1262 document, as it was gifted to a Portuguese ricohombre. Population of Pontón boomed in the 16th century, specially in its first half, and the construction of a stone bridge began in 1561.

The current municipality of Puente Genil was formed upon the merging of La Puente de Don Gonzalo with Miragenil in 1834. Puente Genil underwent an important industrialisation process in the late 19th century, standing out in the food industry in relation to membrillo confection.

== Description ==
The town is an agricultural centre, also known for its Semana Santa celebration, contracted in the local vernacular to "mananta".

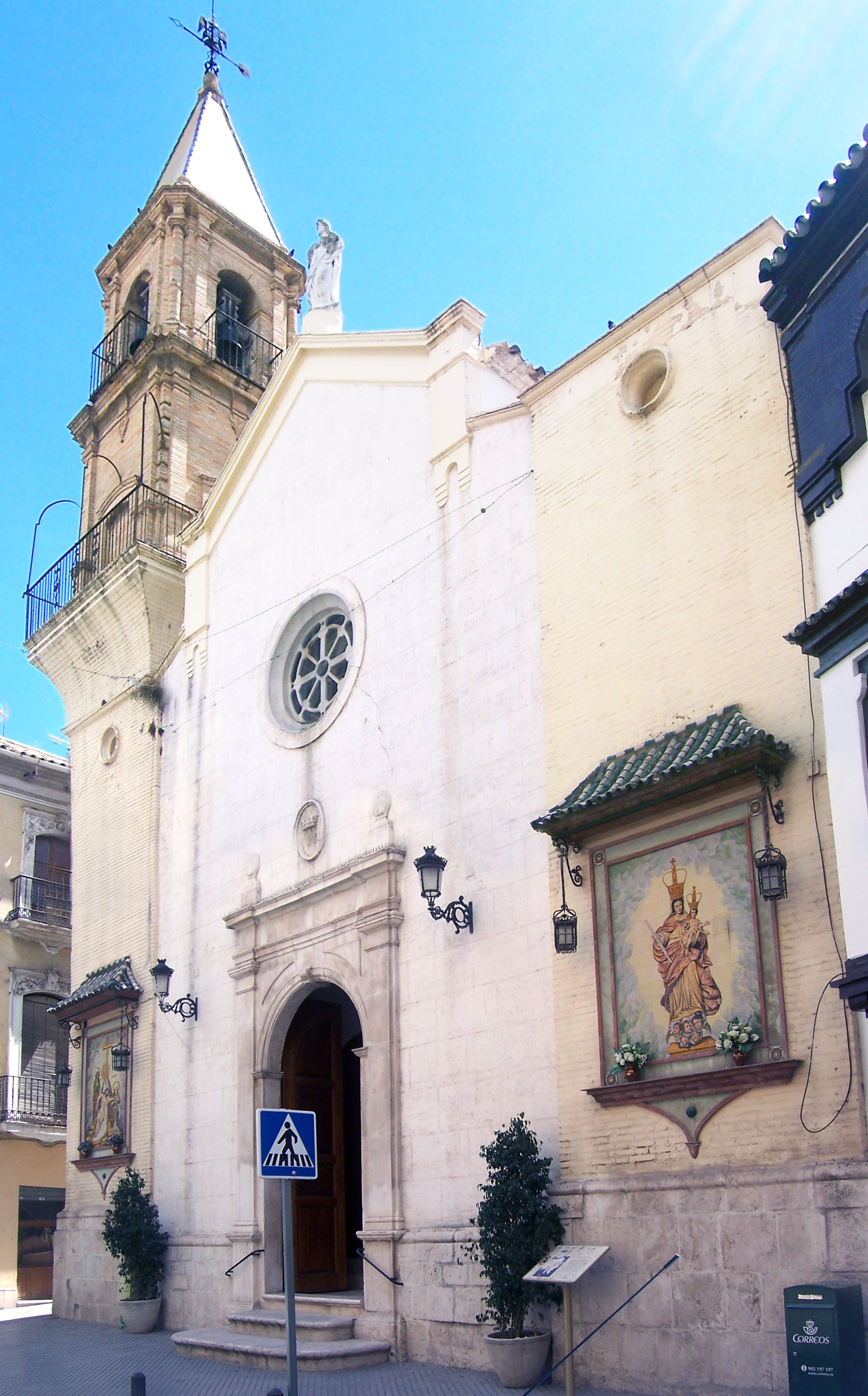
Parish church of La Purificación

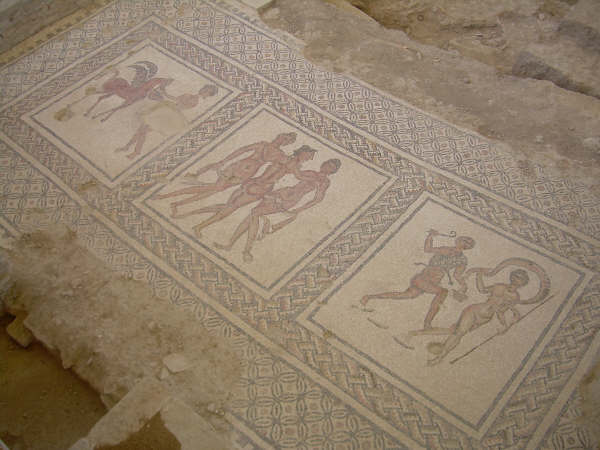
Mosaic of the Three Graces

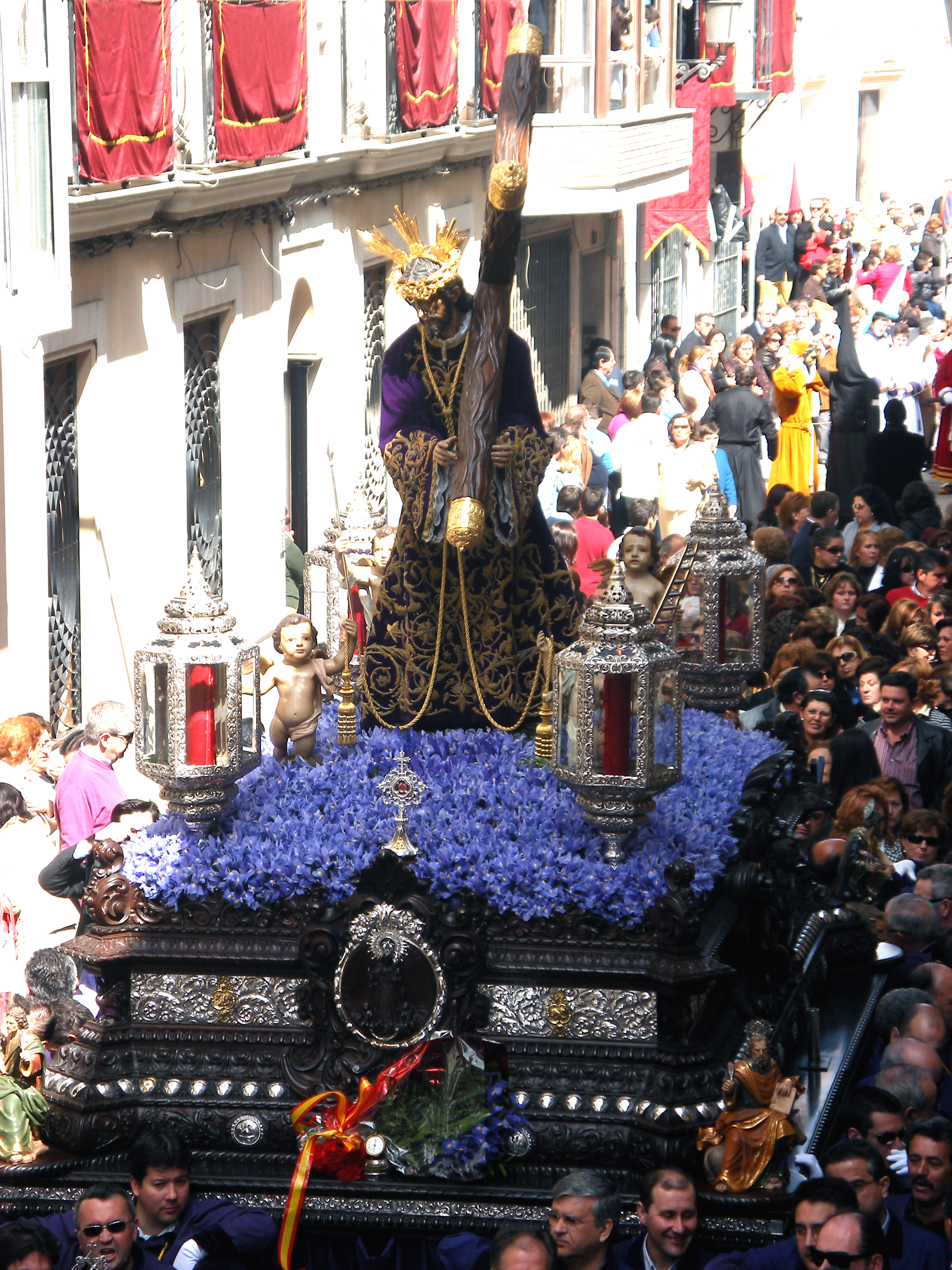
Religious procession

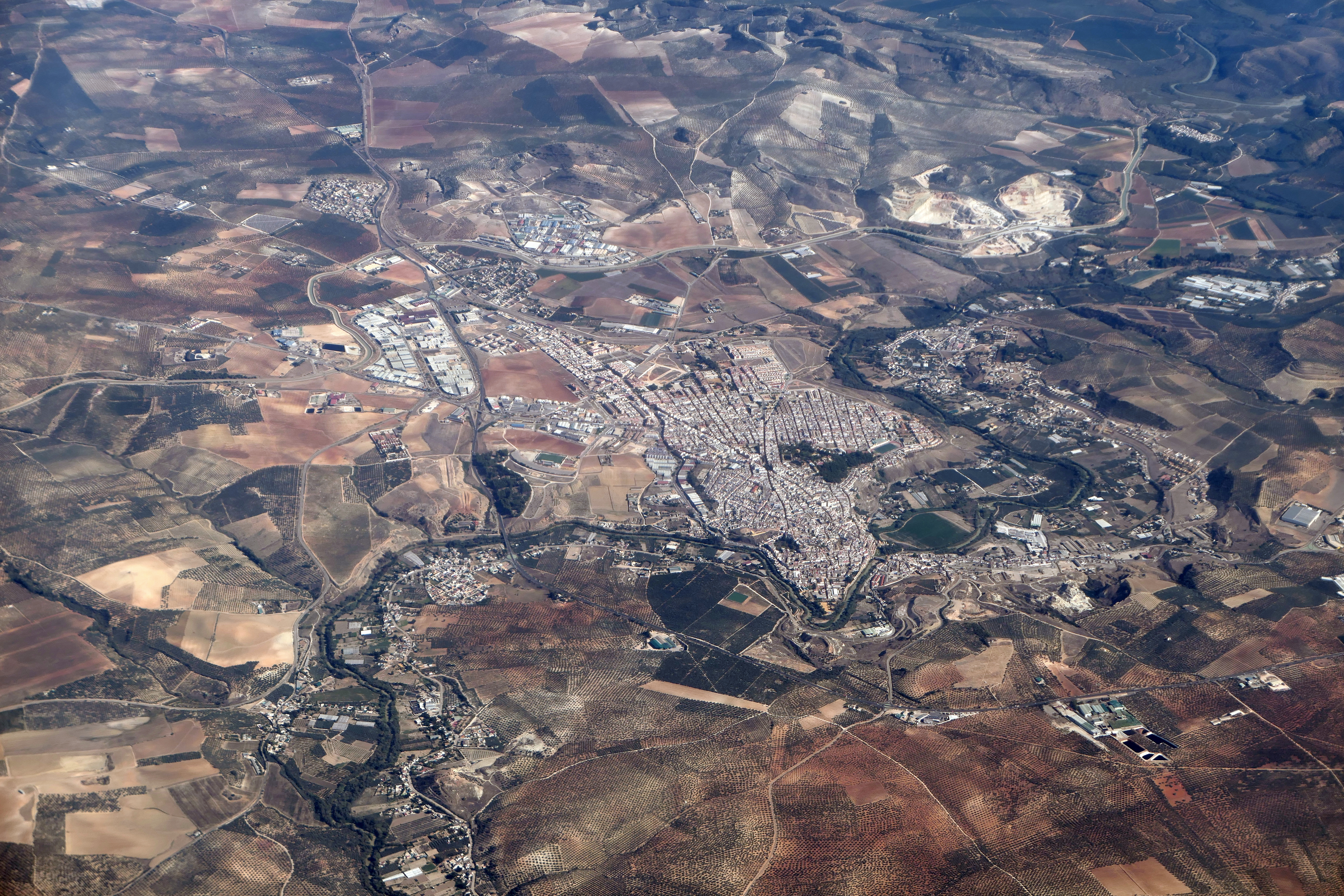
An aerial view of the town and surrounding countryside

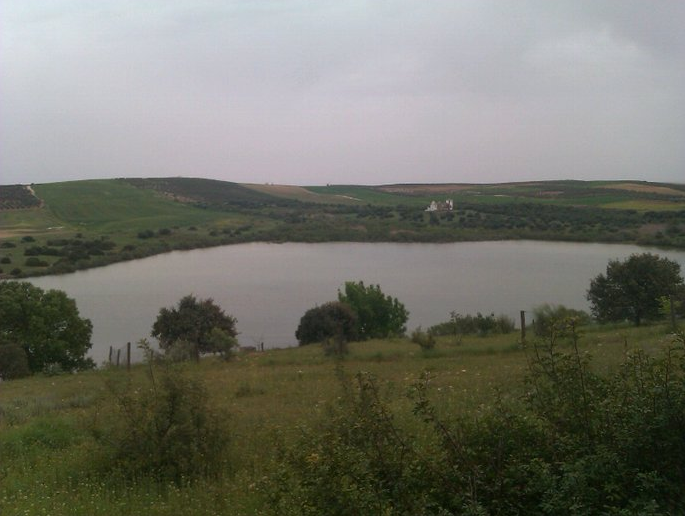
Laguna de Tíscar, a Ramsar site located in the Puente Genil municipality

== Transport ==
Puente Genil is served by Puente Genil-Herrera railway station, around 4 km from the town centre on the AVE high-speed rail line from Madrid to Málaga.

== See also ==
- List of municipalities in Córdoba

== Bibliography ==
- Fernández Cacho, Silvia; Fernández Salinas, Víctor; Hernández León, Elodia; López Martín, Esther; Quintero Morón, Victoria; Rodrigo Cámara, José María; Zarza Balluguera, Daniel (2010). "Campiña de Córdoba". Paisajes y patrimonio cultural en Andalucía. Tiempo, usos e imágenes (PDF). Vol. 1. Seville: Instituto Andaluz del Patrimonio Histórico. ISBN 978-84-9959-024-0.
