= Seville–Santa Justa railway station =

Railway station in Spain

Sevilla–Santa Justa
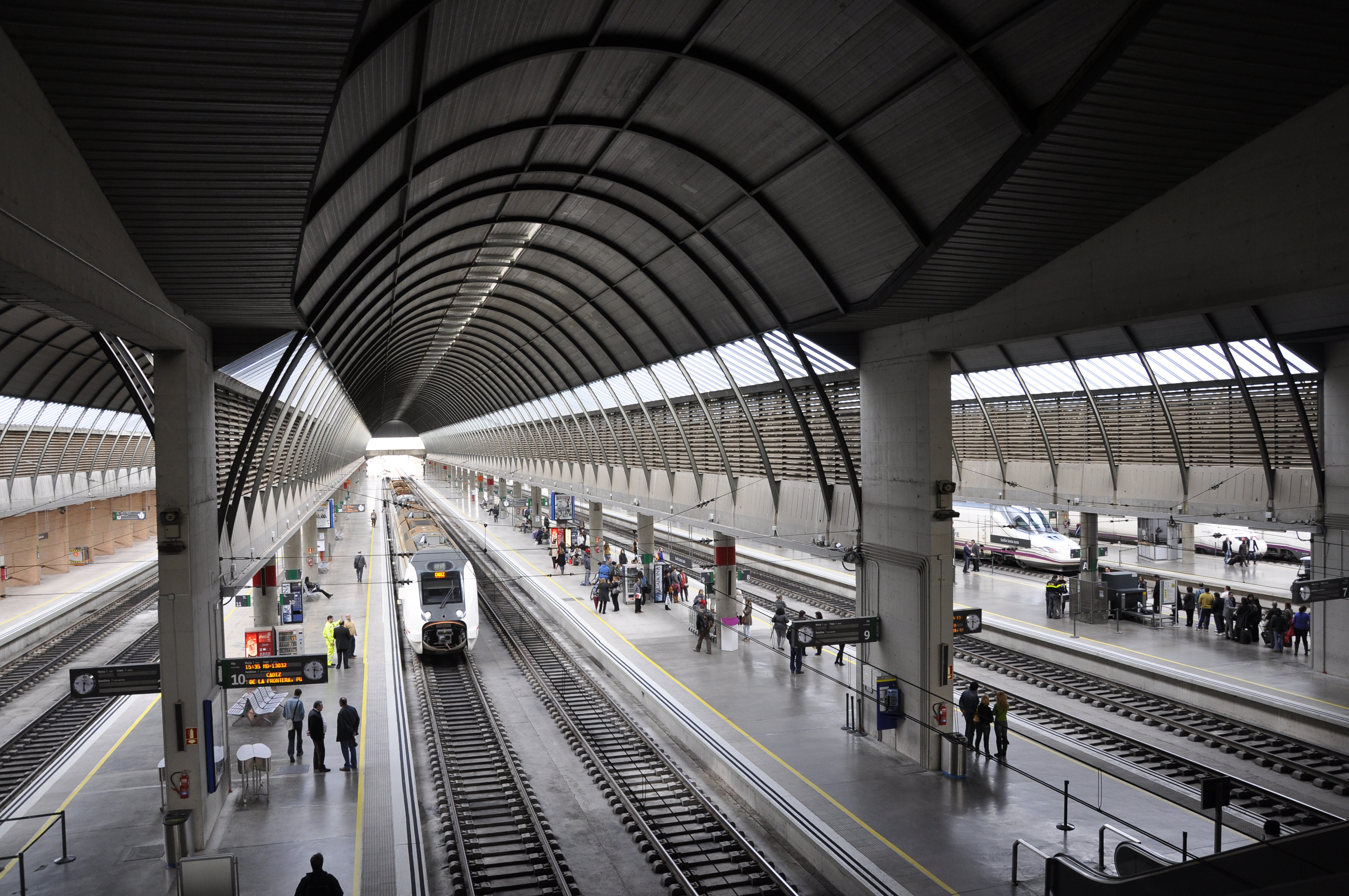
- Station platforms in 2009

General information
- Location: Avenida José Laguillo, 11, San Pablo-Santa Justa, 41007; Seville, Andalusia; Spain
- Coordinates: 37.3922°N 5.9750°W
- Owner: Adif
- Operator: Renfe
- Lines: Madrid–Seville high-speed rail line; Alcázar de San Juan–Cádiz
- Platforms: 12

Other information
- IATA code: XQA

History
- Opened: 2 May 1991

Passengers
- 2024: 12.74 million
Location

Seville–Santa Justa railway station is the major railway station of the Spanish city of Seville, Andalusia. It was opened in 1991 with the inauguration of the Madrid–Seville high-speed rail line, and serves around 12.7 million passengers a year.

== History ==
Seville's first main railway station was called Plaza de Armas, which was situated on the banks of the Guadalquivir river as a terminus station for trains heading north of the city. A southern terminus known as the Cádiz station served southbound trains. As part of the preparations for the arrival of the Seville Expo '92, the rail tracks on the river bank were removed and the area redeveloped. The Madrid–Seville high-speed rail line was opened in 1992 with the new Santa Justa railway station connected via a tunnel to the underground San Bernardo railway station, allowing through services north to south.

== Services ==
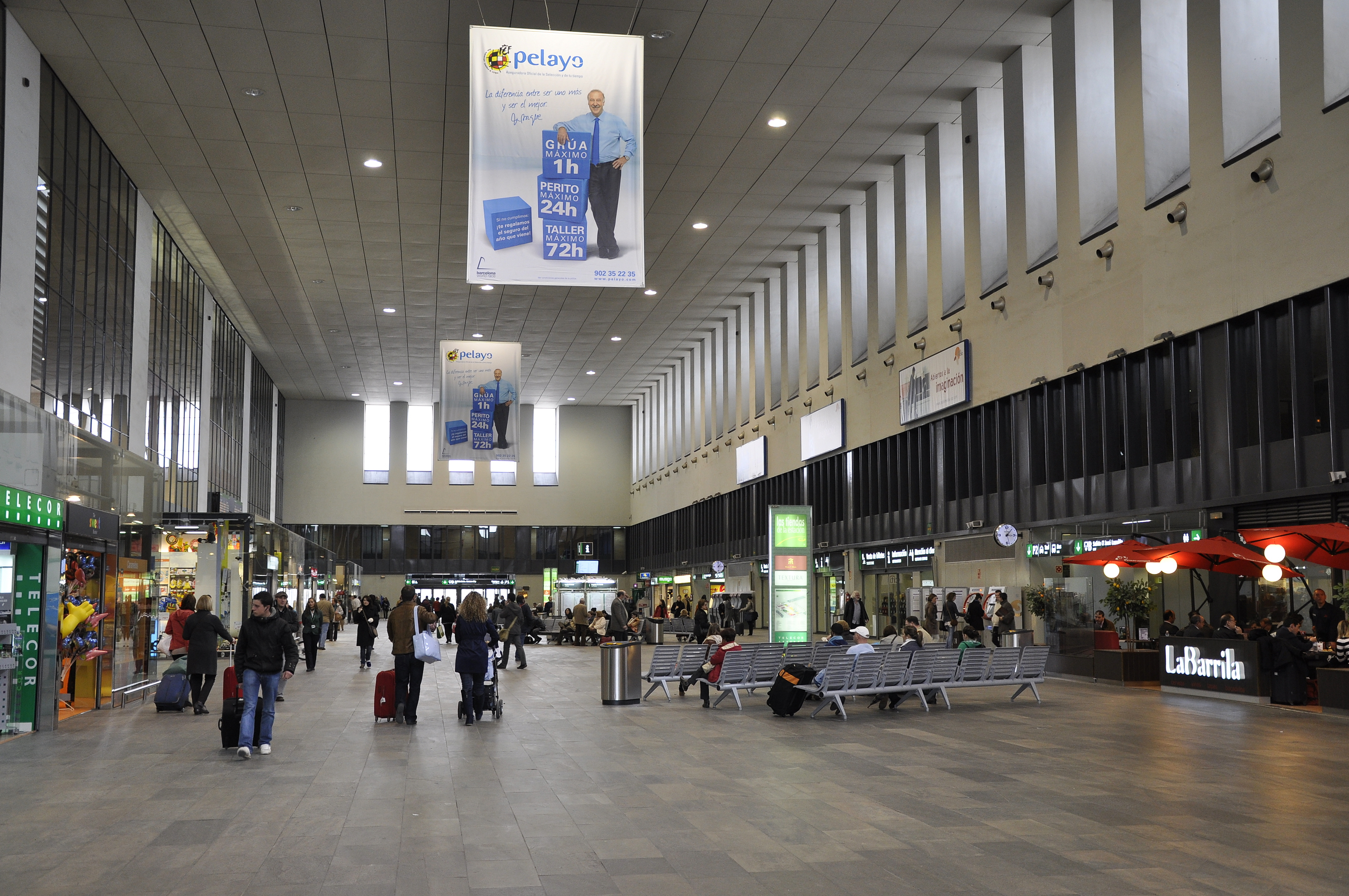
Station hall in 2011

Santa Justa is the hub of the Cercanías Sevilla commuter rail network, and is served by AVE high-speed trains to Madrid and Barcelona via Córdoba, and southward AVE services to Málaga María Zambrano and Granada via Antequera-Santa Ana. Alvia trains operate from Madrid to Cádiz via Santa Justa, as well as Larga and Media Distancia services to Algeciras, Almería, Huelva and Jaén. It is also served by six TUSSAM bus routes.

Preceding station	Renfe Operadora	Following station
Córdoba towards Madrid Puerta de Atocha	AVE	Terminus
Córdoba towards Barcelona Sants	AVE	Terminus
Córdoba towards Valencia-Joaquín Sorolla	AVE	Terminus
Córdoba towards Madrid Puerta de Atocha	Alvia	Jerez de la Frontera towards Cádiz
Córdoba towards Santander	Alvia	Jerez de la Frontera towards Cádiz
Córdoba towards Gijón	Alvia	Jerez de la Frontera towards Cádiz
Córdoba towards Barcelona Sants	Intercity	Terminus
San Bernardo towards Cádiz	Media Distancia 65	Terminus
Los Rosales towards Jaén	Media Distancia 66	Terminus
San Bernardo towards Málaga María Zambrano	Media Distancia 67	Terminus
San Bernardo towards Almería	Media Distancia 68	Terminus
Benacazón towards Huelva	Media Distancia 72	Terminus
Los Rosales towards Cáceres	Media Distancia 74	Terminus
Córdoba towards Málaga María Zambrano	Media Distancia 84	Terminus
Preceding station	Cercanías Sevilla	Following station
La Rinconada towards Lora del Río	C-1	San Bernardo towards Lebrija
San Jerónimo towards Cartuja	C-2	Terminus
La Rinconada towards Cazalla-Constantina	C-3	Terminus
Palacio de Congresos clockwise loop	C-4	San Bernardo counter-clockwise loop
San Jerónimo towards Benacazón	C-5	San Bernardo towards Jardines de Hércules

== Projects ==
The MetroCentro tram line is projected to be extended to serve Santa Justa station. The proposed Line 2 of the Seville Metro will also serve the station if built.
