= Renfe Class 102 =

Spanish high-speed train type

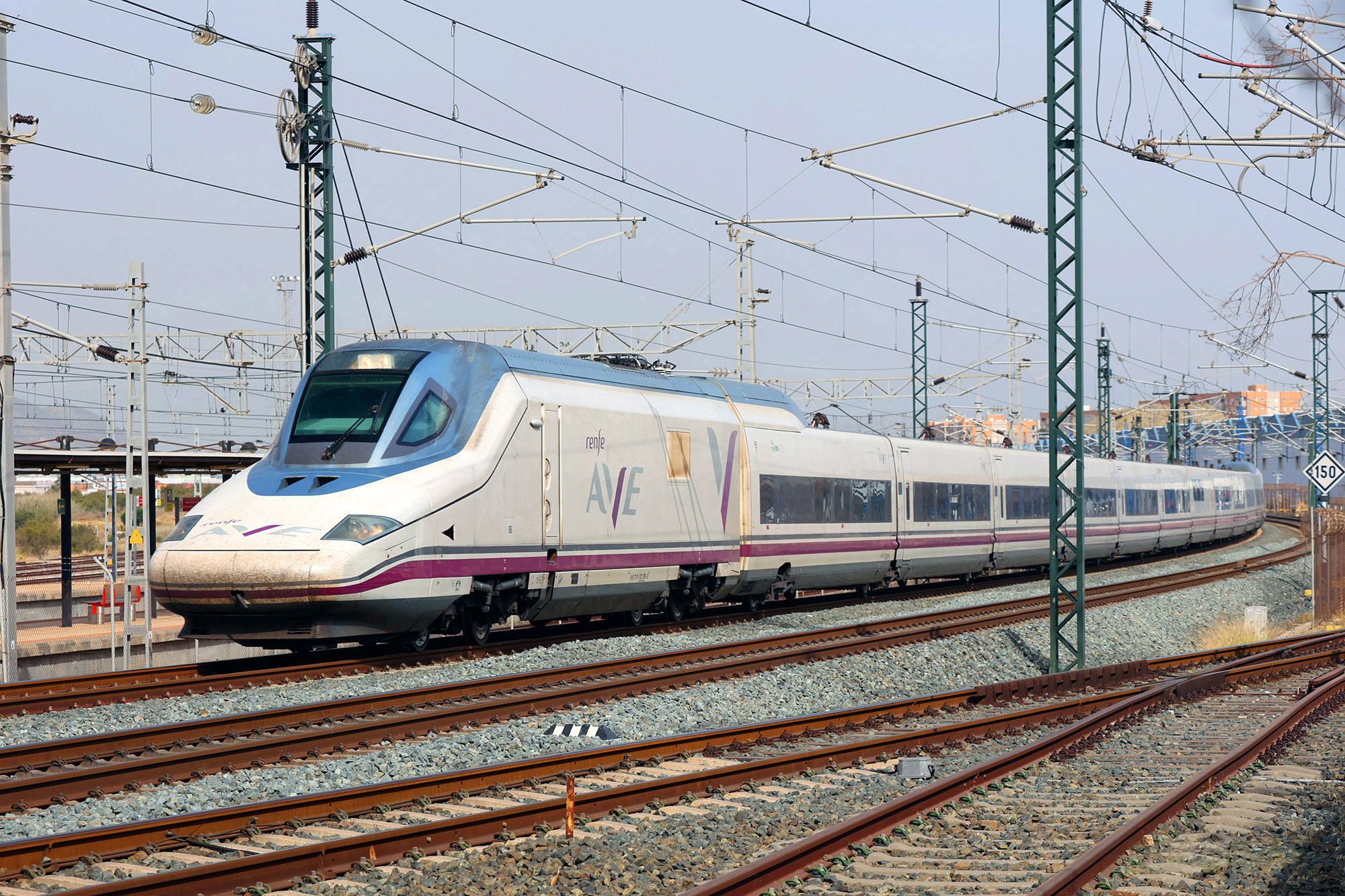
- AVE Class 102 trainset
- Stock type: High-speed electric trainset
- In service: 2005–present
- Manufacturer: Talgo / Bombardier
- Family name: Talgo 350
- Entered service: 26 February 2005
- Number built: 46 trainsets: 16 S-102 and 30 S-112
- Formation: 14 cars: 2 power cars and 12 passenger trailers
- Capacity: S-102: 316 seats S-112: 353 seats
- Operator: Renfe Operadora

Specifications
- Car body construction: Welded aluminium-alloy extrusions
- Train length: 200 m (656 ft 2 in)
- Car length: Power cars: 20 m (65 ft 7 in); Intermediate trailers: 13.140 m (43 ft 1 in); End trailers: 13.890 m (45 ft 7 in)
- Width: Power cars: 2.960 m (9 ft 8 1/2 in); Trailers: 2.942 m (9 ft 7 7/8 in)
- Height: Power cars: 4.000 m (13 ft 1 1/2 in); Trailers: 3.365 m (11 ft 1/2 in)
- Floor height: 756 mm (29.8 in)
- Platform height: 550 mm (22 in) or 760 mm (30 in)
- Wheelbase: Motor bogie: 2.650 m (8 ft 8.3 in)
- Maximum speed: 330 km/h (205 mph)
- Weight: 322 t (317 long tons; 355 short tons)
- Axle load: 17 t (17 long tons; 19 short tons)
- Traction system: IGBT
- Traction motors: 8 × 1 MW three-phase asynchronous motors
- Power output: 8,000 kW (11,000 hp)
- Tractive effort: 200 kN (45,000 lbf) starting
- Electric system: 25 kV 50 Hz AC overhead line
- Current collection: Pantograph
- Wheels driven: 16
- Bogies: 4 motor bogies and 13 Talgo wheelsets; 21 axles total
- Braking systems: Regenerative, rheostatic and pneumatic disc brakes; ABS on pneumatic braking system
- Safety systems: ETCS/ERTMS levels 1 and 2, STM-LZB, ASFA 200
- Track gauge: 1,435 mm (4 ft 8 1/2 in) standard gauge

The Renfe Class 102 or S-102 (Note: S-102 denotes 'Serie 102 de Renfe', the 1xx series is used for fixed passenger high speed electric trains) (nicknamed "Pato" in Spanish, because its nose looks like the beak of a duck) is a push-pull high-speed train used for the AVE service and operated in Spain by the state-run railway company Renfe, and based on Bombardier Transportation's power car technology. Outside AVE service, Talgo markets this train as the Talgo 350.

Further production of closely related trains, differing in seating arrangement, resulted in the S-112.

== Background, design and orders ==
The AVE Class 102 was constructed by Talgo with Adtranz (later Bombardier Transportation) providing the power car technology. It was primarily designed for the Madrid-Barcelona line.

The trainsets consist of Talgo passenger cars modified in order to allow speeds of up to 350 km/h (220 mph) with power cars at each end. However, its certified maximum operating speed is 330 km/h (210 mph) due to the limits of its eight 1,000 kW (1,300 hp) motors. The trainsets can consist of up to 12 Talgo series VII coaches.

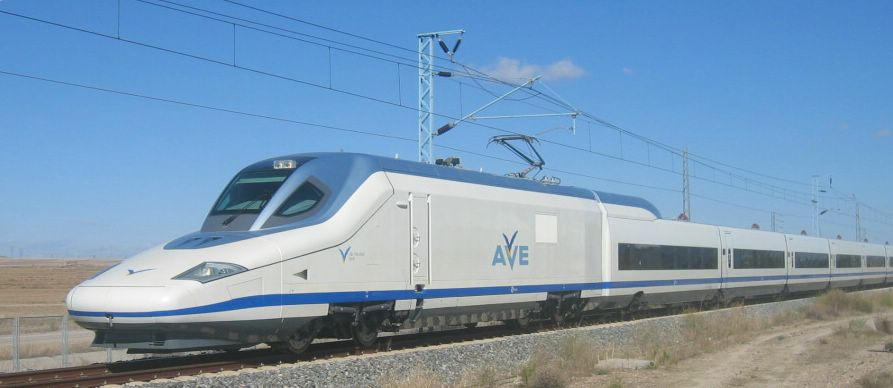
Power unit with a 'beak'

The train is nicknamed Pato, Spanish for duck, due to the aerodynamic design of the power cars resembling a beak. The beak design reduces noise created by air resistance at top speeds.

The series trains were intended for a top speed of 330 km/h (210 mph). This top speed was supposed to be enough to fulfill the tender condition of a two-and-a-half-hour travel time between Madrid and Barcelona. Experts ascribe this reduction compared to original plans to budgetary reasons, which derive from the strongly increased power requirements at even higher speeds.

=== Formation ===
Each Class 102 trainset has a power car on each end and 12 articulated Talgo cars between them, for a total of 14 cars and a length of 200 m (660 ft). As built, the passenger accommodation comprised two Club coaches, three Preferente coaches, one cafeteria coach and six Turista coaches, providing 316 passenger places in total.

The as-built formation is shown below from the Club end to the Turista end. As the trainsets are bidirectional, this does not represent a fixed geographic orientation.

Vehicle position	1	2	3	4	5	6	7	8	9	10	11	12	13	14
Passenger coach No.	—	1	2	3	4	5	6	7	8	9	10	11	12	—
Designation	Power car	End trailer	Intermediate trailer	Intermediate trailer	Intermediate trailer	Intermediate trailer with galley	Cafeteria trailer	Accessible trailer	Intermediate trailer	Intermediate trailer	Intermediate trailer	Intermediate trailer	End trailer	Power car
Accommodation (as built)	—	Club	Club	Preferente	Preferente	Preferente	Cafeteria	Turista	Turista	Turista	Turista	Turista	Turista	—
Passenger places	—	24	21	26	26	24	—	19 seats + 2 wheelchair spaces	36	36	36	36	30	—

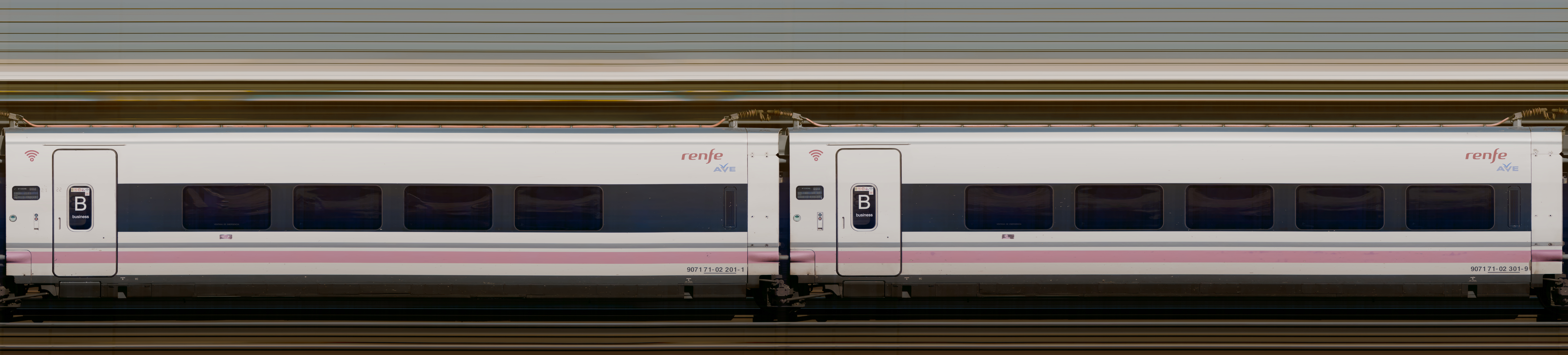
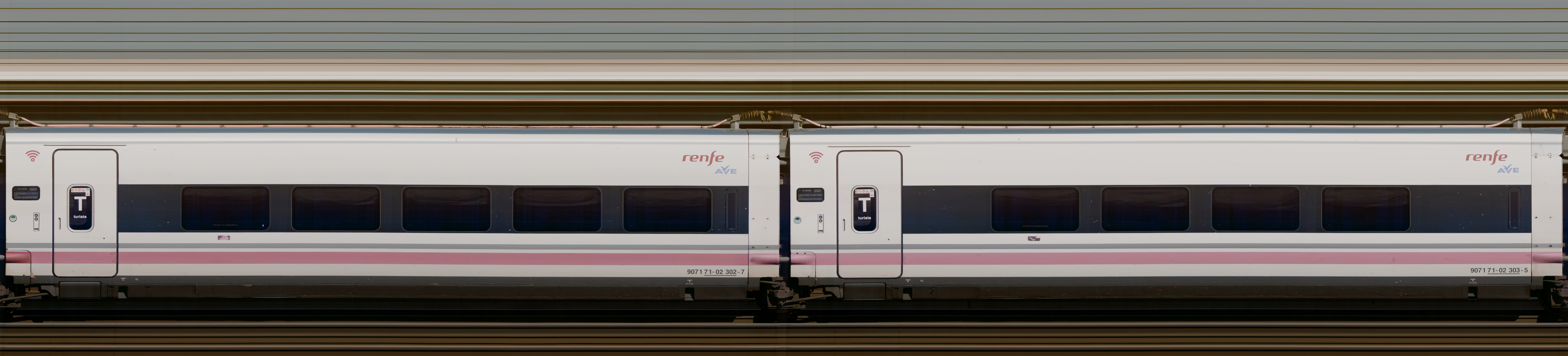
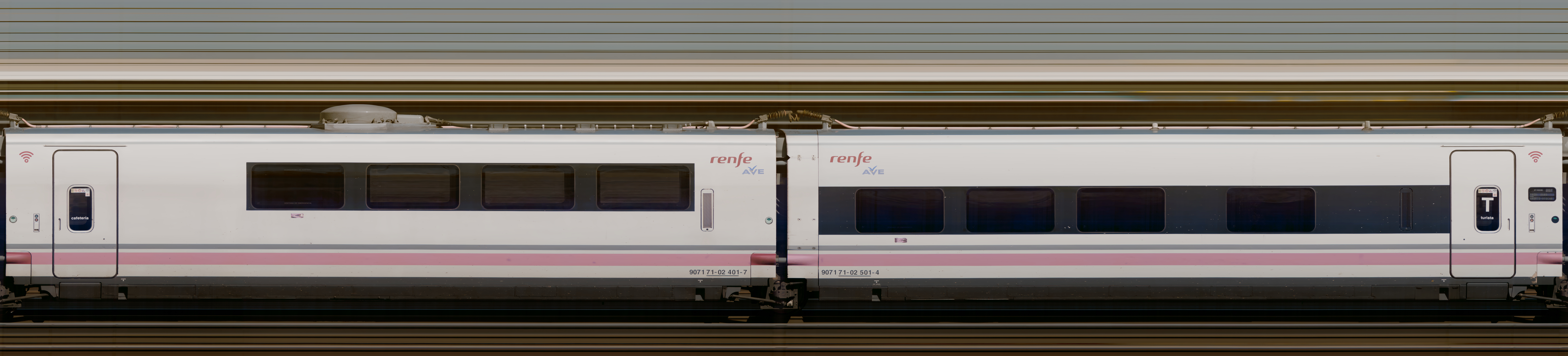
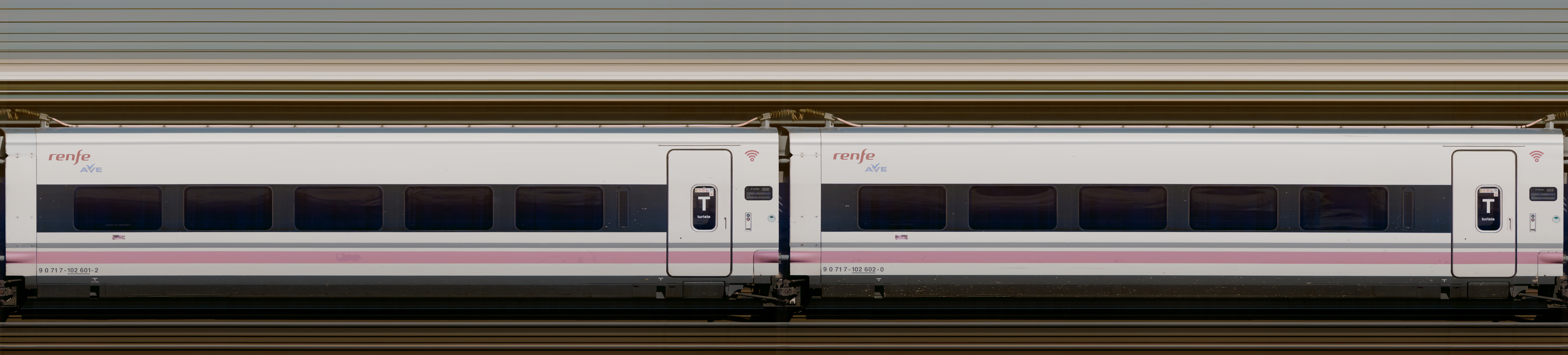
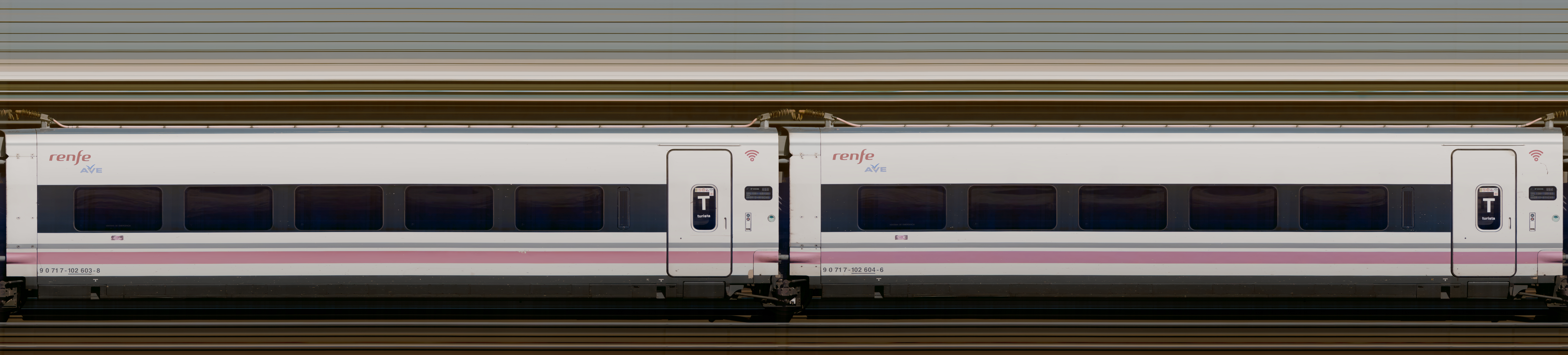

A complete 14-vehicle Class 102 trainset passing Madrid in 2018, shown in seven line-scan segments from one power car to the other.

=== Renfe Class 112 ===
Renfe's original order in 2004 was for 16 series units, delivery of which began in 2004. A follow-up order for 30 similar trains to be delivered in 2008-2010 and designated as class 112 (S-112). The first production unit was unveiled in June 2010.

== Introduction, testing and operations ==
In trials with the prototype unit (later used by track authority ADIF as test train Class 330), on 11 October 2002, 362 km/h (225 mph) was achieved.

Type approval tests began in 2004. Type approval requires test runs at speeds 10% above the desired permitted top speed. During the approval tests, a new record of 365 km/h (227 mph) was achieved in the early hours of 26 June 2004.

After the successful completion of the tests, the first eight series units commenced operation on the Madrid-Zaragoza-Lleida line on 26 February 2005. Initially, maximum service speed was restricted to 200 km/h (120 mph), due to problems with the train control and signalling system on the line.

After the commissioning of the train control system ETCS L1, the top speed was increased in steps. Since 7 May 2007, the trains travel with a maximum operating speed of 300 km/h (190 mph).

After the stabilisation of the train control system ETCS L2, the trains may cover the distance of 621 km between Madrid and Barcelona in about 2 hours 30 minutes, with a top speed of 330 km/h (210 mph). However, presently, non-stop runs are carried by the Class 103 trains, while the S-102 are deployed for runs with intermediate stops, with travel times between 2 hours 57 minutes and 3 hours 23 minutes.

== Export ==
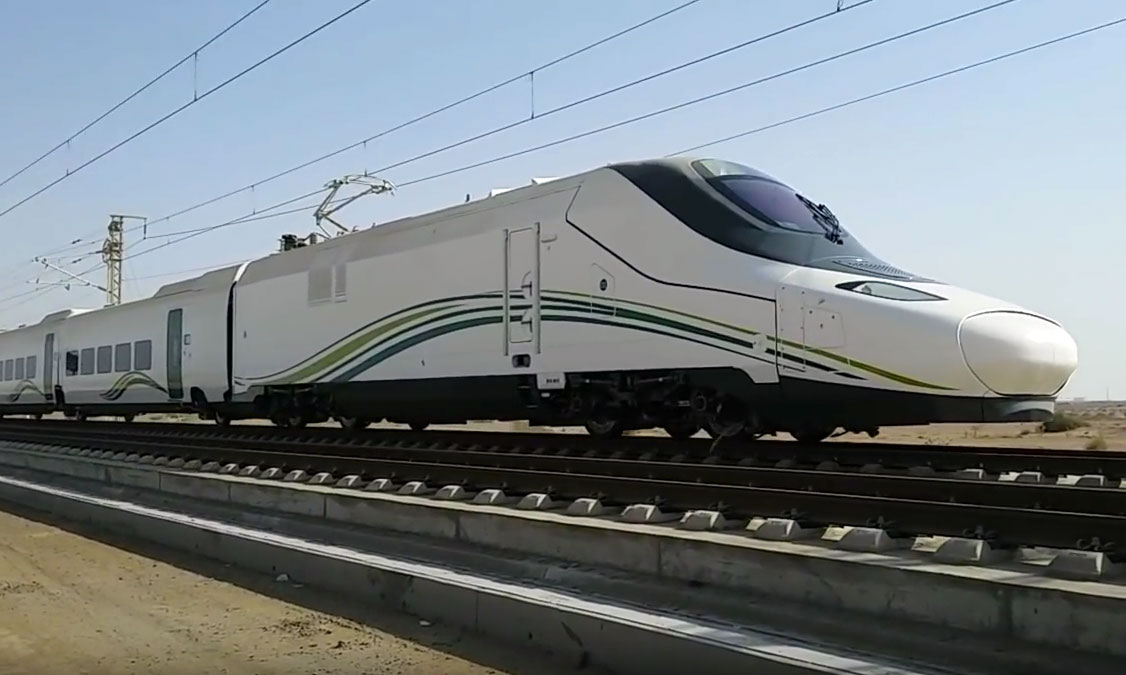
Talgo 350 for Haramain HSR

Talgo 350 trains based on the Class 102 design are being used on the Haramain high-speed railway line in Saudi Arabia under a contract announced in October 2011. The service became operational in September 2018.

== See also ==
- Renfe Class 130
- Haramain High Speed Rail Project
- List of high speed trains
