= Granada railway station =

Main railway station of Granada

Granada
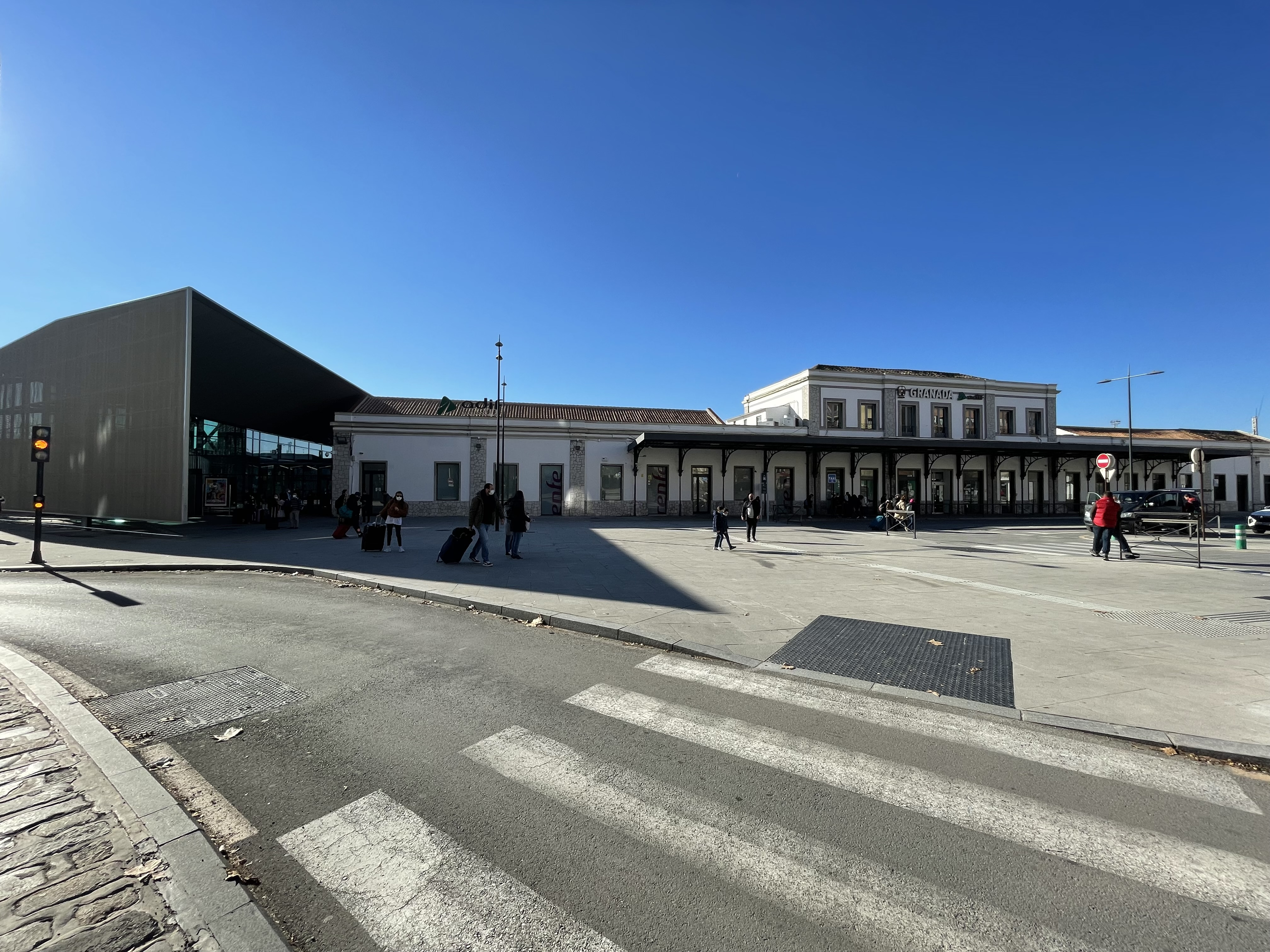
- Main entrance of the station in 2021

General information
- Location: Granada, Andalusia, Spain
- Coordinates: 37.1837°N 3.6086°W
- Owner: Adif
- Operator: Renfe
- Lines: Antequera–Granada high-speed rail line; Granada–Moreda; Granada–Fuente de Piedra
- Platforms: 3

Other information
- IATA code: YJG

History
- Opened: 1874

Passengers
- 2024: 2,034,576
Location

Granada railway station is the main railway station of the Spanish city of Granada, Andalusia. The building dates back to the 1874, but the facilities have been modernised over the years, most notably to accommodate AVE high-speed trains.

== Services ==
As of 2019, Granada served by AVE high-speed trains to Madrid and Barcelona, as well as Media Distancia services to Seville-Santa Justa, Algeciras and Almería. Outside the main station building there is a stop on the Granada Metro light rail line 1.

Preceding station	Renfe Operadora	Following station
Antequera-Santa Ana towards Madrid Atocha	AVE	Terminus
Antequera-Santa Ana towards Barcelona Sants	AVE	Terminus
Loja-San Francisco towards Seville-Santa Justa	Media Distancia 68	Iznalloz towards Almería
Loja-San Francisco towards Algeciras	Media Distancia 70	Terminus
Terminus	Media Distancia 71	Iznalloz towards Linares-Baeza
