= Avant (train) =

Spanish railway service operated by Renfe

Renfe Avant

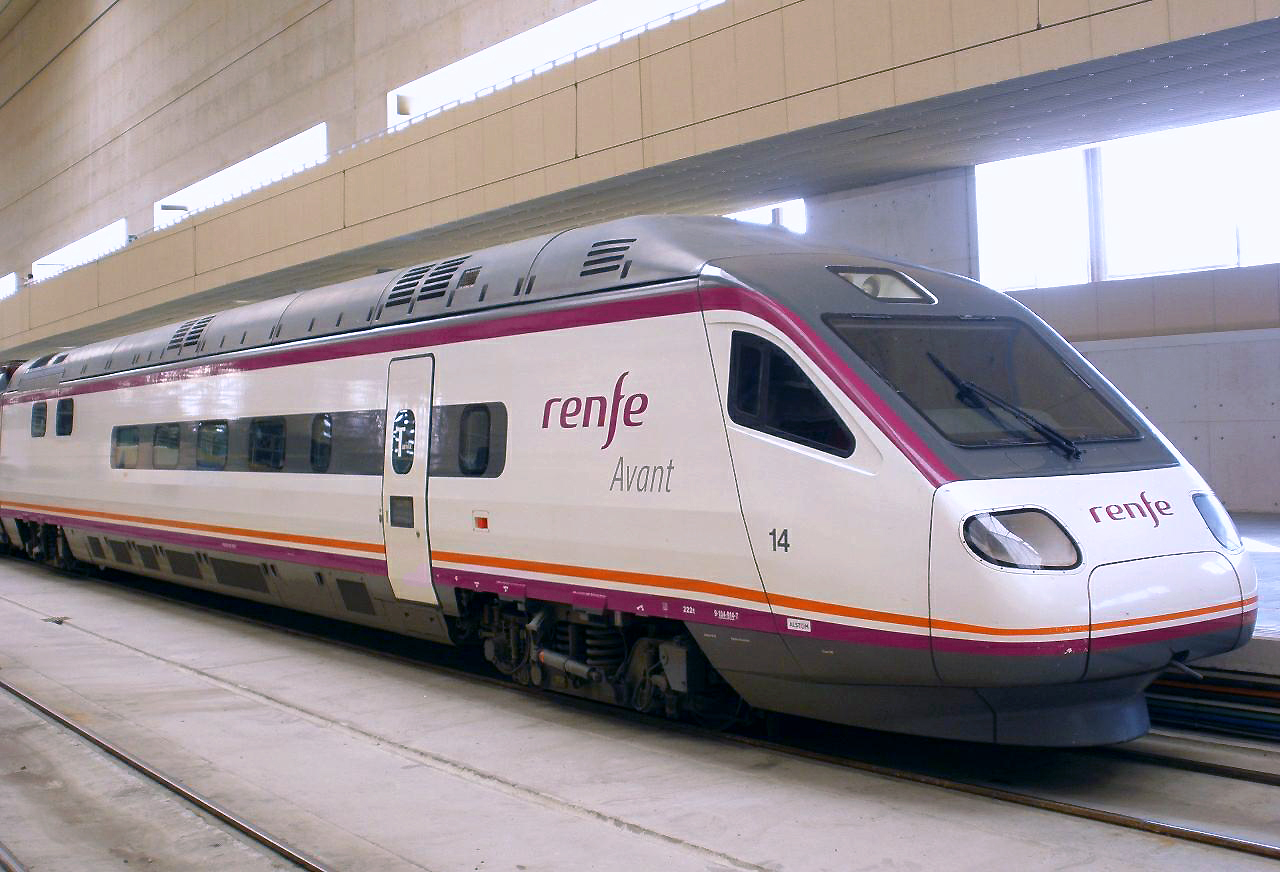
- Fleet: Avant S-104; Avant S-114; Avant S-121
- Parent company: Renfe

Technical
- Track gauge: Standard (1435 mm), Iberian (1668 mm) (only in Galicia)
- Electrification: 25 kV AC (some sections on 3 kV DC network)

Other
- Website: www.renfe.com/es/en/travel/prepare-your-trip/trains-mid-distance-avant

Avant is a high-speed, medium-distance passenger transport rail service, operated in Spain by the Spanish public company Renfe. Avant services circulate at a maximum speed of 250 km/h (160 mph), compared to the 300 km/h (190 mph) maximum speed of the AVE service. Their routes usually cover different provinces within the same autonomous community or between neighboring ones. Regional services at conventional speed are called Renfe Media Distancia.

Avant services are carried out by series 104, 114 and 121 trainsets, in a single class configuration without a cafeteria (except in some series 104 units).

== History ==
In October 1992, a new high-speed medium distance service (AV Media Distancia operating under the AVE Lanzadera brand) began between Madrid, Ciudad Real and Puertollano, using spare class 100 trains. In November 2003 a new service began between Seville and Córdoba using new class 104 trains, reducing journey times between the two cities to 40 minutes.

In 2004 the brand was renamed RENFE Avant, and all services started to use Avant S-104 trains, leaving class 100 for AVE services. The construction of a 21-kilometre (13 mi) stretch of high-speed line from Madrid to Toledo allowed the inauguration of a medium distance service in November 2005. The journey time between the two cities is now less than 30 minutes. The high-speed link combined with high property prices in Madrid has encouraged many Madrid commuters to settle in Ciudad Real, the first stop on the Madrid–Seville line. There has, however, been controversy over the construction of this line as the change to standard-gauge track meant that towns such as Getafe, Aranjuez and Algodor, which now have no commercial services, lost their direct services to Toledo. Furthermore, since Toledo is now connected by standard-gauge track it is impossible for other passenger or goods trains to reach it that have not come from other high-speed lines.

Further Avant services have been launched since then with the expansion of the high-speed lines to Valladolid, Barcelona, Málaga, Valencia, Granada, Murcia and Galicia.

== Services ==
Map showing Avant services in 2024

As of 2024 Renfe offers the following Avant services:

- A Coruña–Santiago de Compostela–Ourense.
- Barcelona−Girona.
- Badajoz−Cáceres.
- Barcelona−Girona−Figueres.
- Barcelona–Tarragona–Lleida.
- Barcelona–Tortosa via Camp de Tarragona, Cambrils, L'Hospitalet de l'Infant, L'Ametlla de Mar, L'Ampolla-Perelló-Deltebre and L'Aldea-Amposta.
- Calatayud–Zaragoza.
- Granada–Córdoba–Seville via Loja, Antequera and Puente Genil-Herrera.
- Madrid–Ciudad Real–Puertollano.
- Madrid–Segovia–Valladolid.
- Madrid–Toledo.
- Málaga–Córdoba–Seville via Antequera and Puente Genil-Herrera.
- Málaga–Granada via Antequera and Loja.
- Murcia–Alicante via Beniel, Orihuela, Callosa Cox and Elx.
- Ourense–Santiago de Compostela–A Coruña.
- Toledo–Madrid–Albacete via Cuenca.
- Valencia–Requena Utiel.

Former services:

- Zaragoza–Huesca via Tardienta.
- A Coruña–Vigo via Santiago de Compostela

== Trains ==
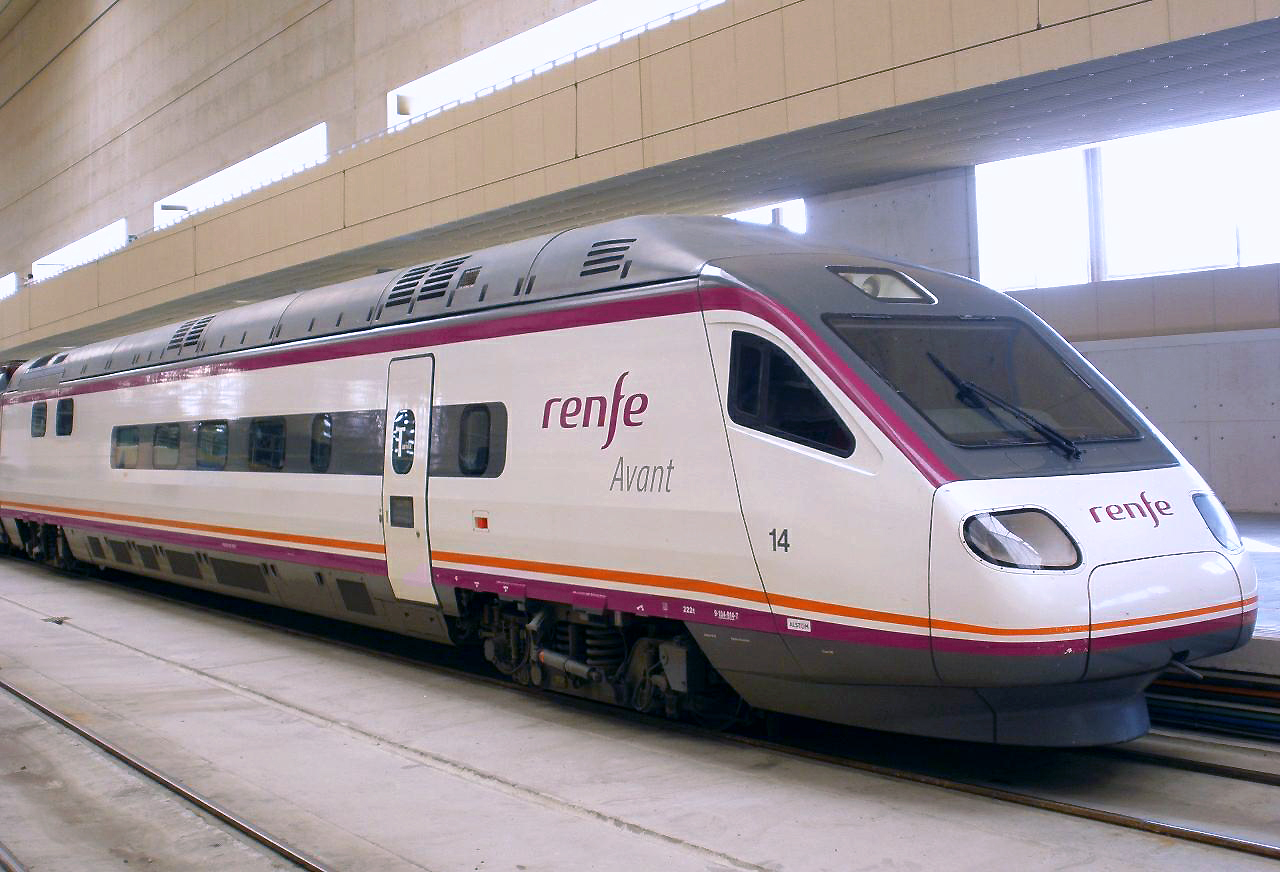
Class 104 train.

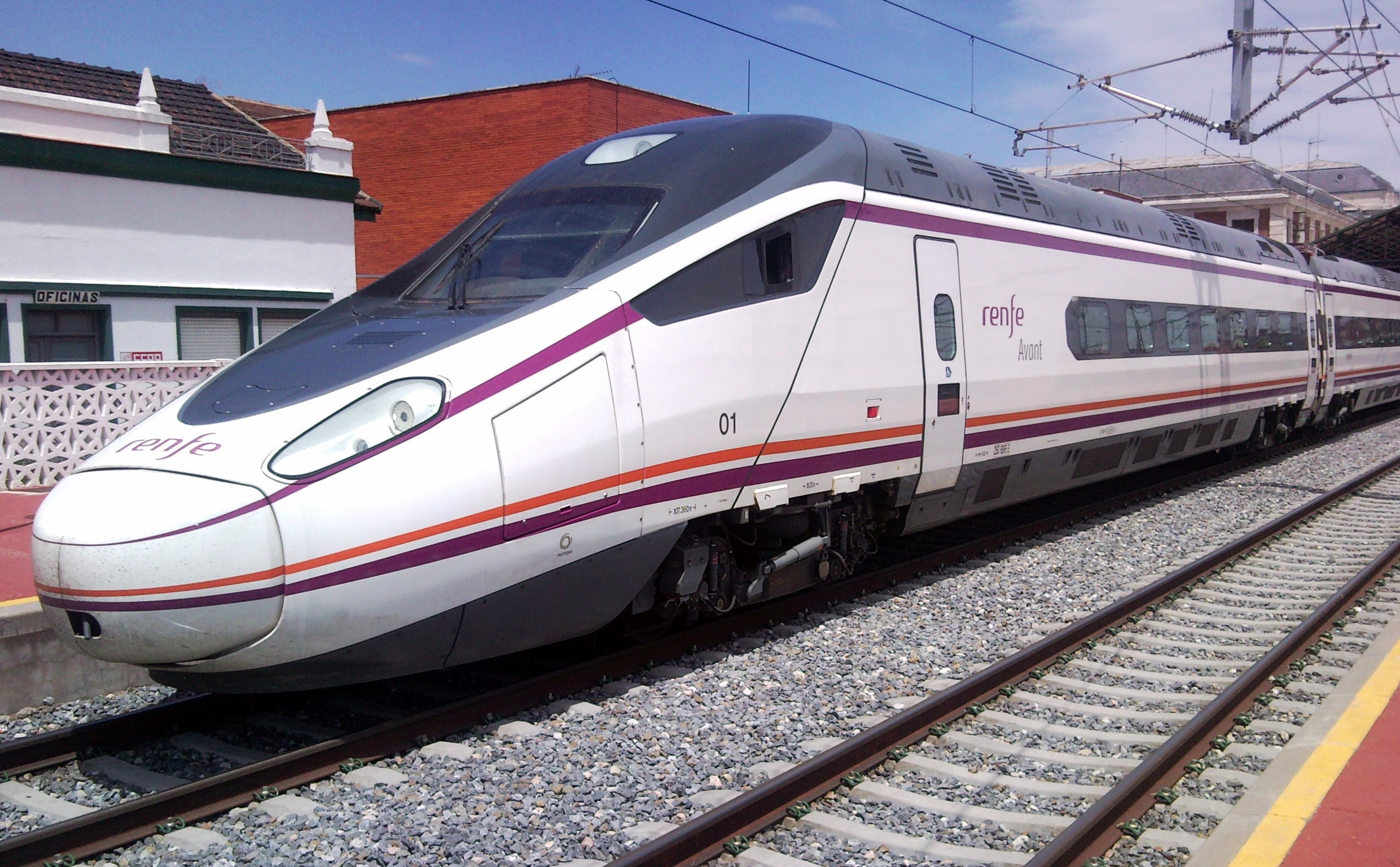
Class 114 train.

Currently, there are the following series of high-speed trains that run the Avant service:

- Avant S-104, manufactured by Alstom and CAF
- Avant S-114, manufactured by Alstom and CAF
- Avant S-121, manufactured by CAF and Alstom

Both Avant class 104 and class 114 trains are Pendolino designs, without tilting capacity:

- Avant class 104 trains are based in ETR 480
- Avant class 114 trains are based in ETR 600

== See also ==
=== High-speed rail services in Spain ===
- AVE
- Alvia
- Euromed
- Avlo
- Ouigo España
- Iryo

=== Rail infrastructure in Spain and Europe ===
- Rail transport in Spain
- High-speed rail in Spain
- High-speed rail in Europe
- Train categories in Europe
