= AVE =

High-speed rail service in Spain

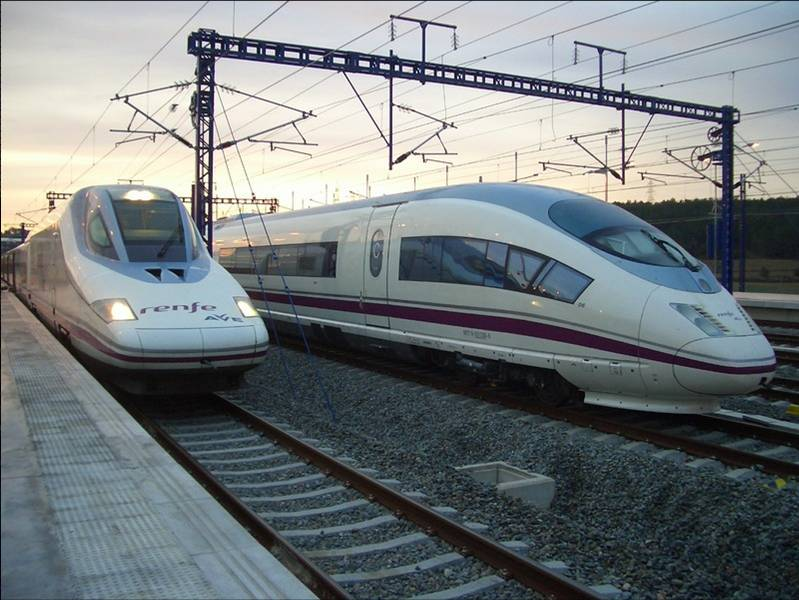
- A Renfe C-102 next to a Renfe C-103
- Main stations: Madrid Atocha, Barcelona Sants, Seville-Santa Justa, Zaragoza–Delicias, Málaga-María Zambrano
- Other stations: Madrid Chamartín, Valencia-Joaquín Sorolla, Granada, Alicante Terminal, Valladolid-Campo Grande, A Coruña-San Cristóbal, Santiago de Compostela, Ourense, Córdoba Central, Castelló de la Plana
- Fleet: 22 S-100; 16 S-102; 26 S-103; 20 S-106; 25 S-112
- Stations called at: 52
- Parent company: Renfe

Technical
- Track gauge: Standard (1435 mm), some sections on Iberian (1668mm)
- Electrification: 25 kV AC (some sections on 3 kV DC network)
- Length: 3,973 km (2,469 mi)

Other
- Website: https://www.renfe.com

Alta Velocidad Española (AVE) (Note: Spanish pronunciation: [ˈalta βeloθiˈðað espaˈɲola], [ˈaβe]) is a high-speed rail service operated by Renfe, the Spanish state railway company. The first AVE service was inaugurated in 1992, with the introduction of the first Spanish high-speed railway connecting the cities of Madrid, Córdoba and Seville. In addition to Renfe's use of the Administrador de Infraestructuras Ferroviarias-managed rail infrastructure in Spain, Renfe offers two AVE services partially in France, connecting respectively Barcelona-Lyon and Madrid-Marseille. Alta Velocidad Española translates to "Spanish High Speed", but the initials are also a play on the word ave, meaning "bird". AVE trains operate at speeds of up to 300 km/h (186 mph).

== Services ==
As of 2024 Renfe offers the following AVE services:

=== Eastern corridor ===
- Madrid–Alicante via Cuenca, Albacete, and Villena (non-stop trains and trains with limited stops also scheduled).
- Madrid–Castellón via Cuenca, Requena-Utiel and Valencia.
- Madrid–Murcia via Elche and Orihuela (some trains arrive in Alicante and reverse to continue to Murcia).
- Madrid–Valencia via Cuenca and Requena-Utiel (non-stop trains also scheduled).

=== Northeast corridor ===
- Madrid–Barcelona via Guadalajara, Calatayud, Zaragoza, Lleida, and Tarragona (non stop trains and trains with selective stops are also scheduled).
- Madrid–Figueres via Guadalajara, Calatayud, Zaragoza, Lleida, Tarragona, Barcelona and Girona (trains are scheduled with selective stops).
- Madrid–Huesca via Guadalajara, Calatayud, Zaragoza, and Tardienta.

=== Northern corridor ===
- Madrid–Gijón via Valladolid, Palencia, León and Oviedo.
- Madrid–León via Segovia, Valladolid and Palencia.

=== Northwest corridor ===
- Madrid–A Coruña via Zamora, Ourense and Santiago De Compostela.
- Madrid–Ourense via Zamora.
- Madrid–Vigo via Zamora, Sanabria, A Gudiña, Ourense, Santiago de Compostela, Vilagarcía de Arousa and Pontevedra (trains with selective stops are also scheduled).

=== Southern corridor ===
- Madrid–Granada via Ciudad Real, Puertollano, Córdoba, Puente Genil-Herrera, Antequera and Loja (trains with selective stops are also scheduled).
- Madrid–Málaga via Ciudad Real, Puertollano, Córdoba, Puente Genil-Herrera, and Antequera (non stop trains and trains with selective stops are also scheduled).
- Madrid–Seville via Ciudad Real, Puertollano, and Córdoba (non stop trains and trains with selective stops are also scheduled).

=== Cross-country ===
- Alicante–León via Albacete, Cuenca, Madrid Chamartín, Valladolid and Palencia.
- Alicante–Ourense via Albacete, Cuenca, Madrid Chamartín and Zamora.
- Barcelona–Granada via Tarragona, Lleida, Zaragoza, Ciudad Real, Puertollano, Córdoba and Antequera.
- Barcelona–Málaga via Tarragona, Lleida, Zaragoza, Ciudad Real, Córdoba, Puente Genil-Herrera, and Antequera.
- Barcelona–Seville via Tarragona, Lleida, Zaragoza, Ciudad Real, Puertollano and Córdoba (trains with selective stops are also scheduled).
- Burgos–Murcia via Valladolid, Segovia, Madrid-Chamartín, Elche and Orihuela.
- Gijón–Castellón via Oviedo, Mieres Del Camín, La Pola, León, Palencia, Valladolid, Segovia, Madrid-Chamartín, Cuenca, Valencia and Sagunto.
- Gijón–Vinaros, via Oviedo, Mieres Del Camín, La Pola, León, Palencia, Valladolid, Segovia, Madrid-Chamartín, Cuenca, Valencia, Sagunto, Castellón, Benicàssim, Oropesa del Mar and Benicarló (only in summertime).
- Huesca–Seville via Tardienta, Zaragoza, Calatayud, Guadalajara, Madrid-Puerta de Atocha and Córdoba
- Málaga–Murcia via Madrid-Puerta de Atocha, Cuenca, Albacete, Villena, Alicante, Elche and Orihuela.
- Valencia–Burgos via Requena-Utiel, Cuenca, Madrid Chamartín and Valladolid (trains with selective stops are also scheduled).
- Valencia–León via Requena-Utiel, Cuenca, Madrid-Chamartín, Segovia, Valladolid and Palencia (trains with selective stops are also scheduled).
- Valencia–Seville via Cuenca, Ciudad Real, Puertollano, and Córdoba.

=== International services ===
- Barcelona–Lyon via Girona, Figueres, Perpignan, Narbonne, Montpellier, Nîmes, and Valence.
- Madrid–Marseille via Guadalajara, Zaragoza, Tarragona, Barcelona, Girona, Figueres, Perpignan, Narbonne, Béziers, Montpellier, Nîmes, Avignon and Aix-en-Provence.

The central hub of the AVE system is Madrid's Puerta de Atocha, except for the Madrid–Asturias, Madrid–Burgos, Madrid–Galicia and Madrid–Alicante lines as well as the majority of the services on the Madrid-Murcia and Madrid-Valencia lines, that terminate at Chamartín station. Madrid Atocha and Chamartín station are linked by Madrid Metro (Line 1) and Cercanías Madrid services but As of 2025 not by any standard gauge lines, making it difficult for high speed trains to serve both.

== Trains ==
There are several series of high-speed trains that run the AVE service:

- S-100, manufactured by Alstom, based on the TGV family trains.
- S-102, manufactured by Talgo and Bombardier, marketed globally as Talgo 350.
- S-103, manufactured by Siemens, marketed globally under the brand Siemens Velaro.
- S-106, manufactured by Talgo, marketed globally as Talgo AVRIL.
- S-112, manufactured by Talgo and Bombardier, an improved version of the S-102 with a different seat layout.
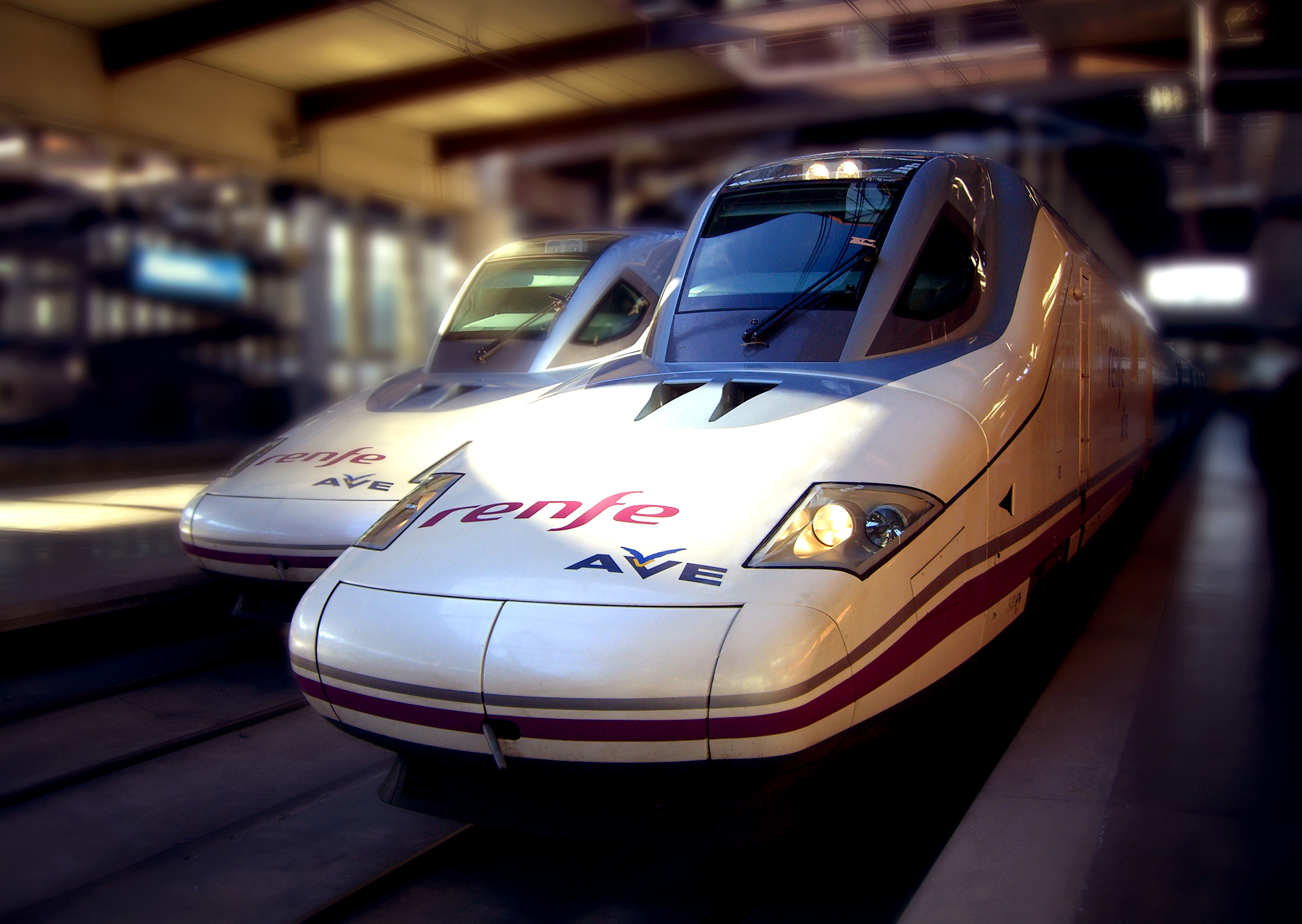
A Talgo 350 train (Renfe Class 102) at Madrid Atocha station.

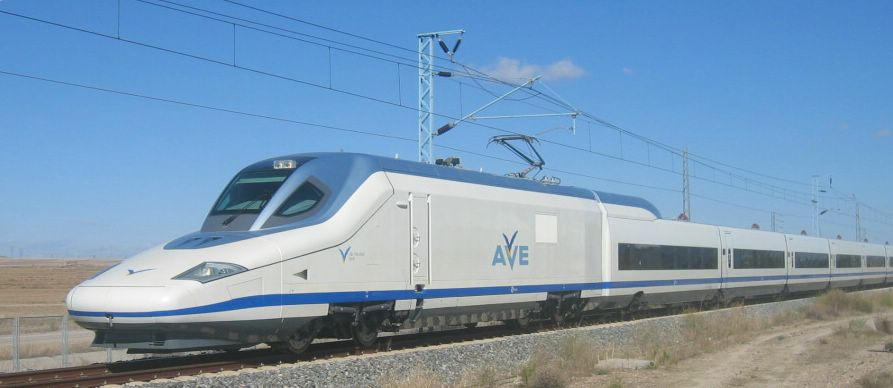
AVE train Talgo 350 (Renfe Class 102)

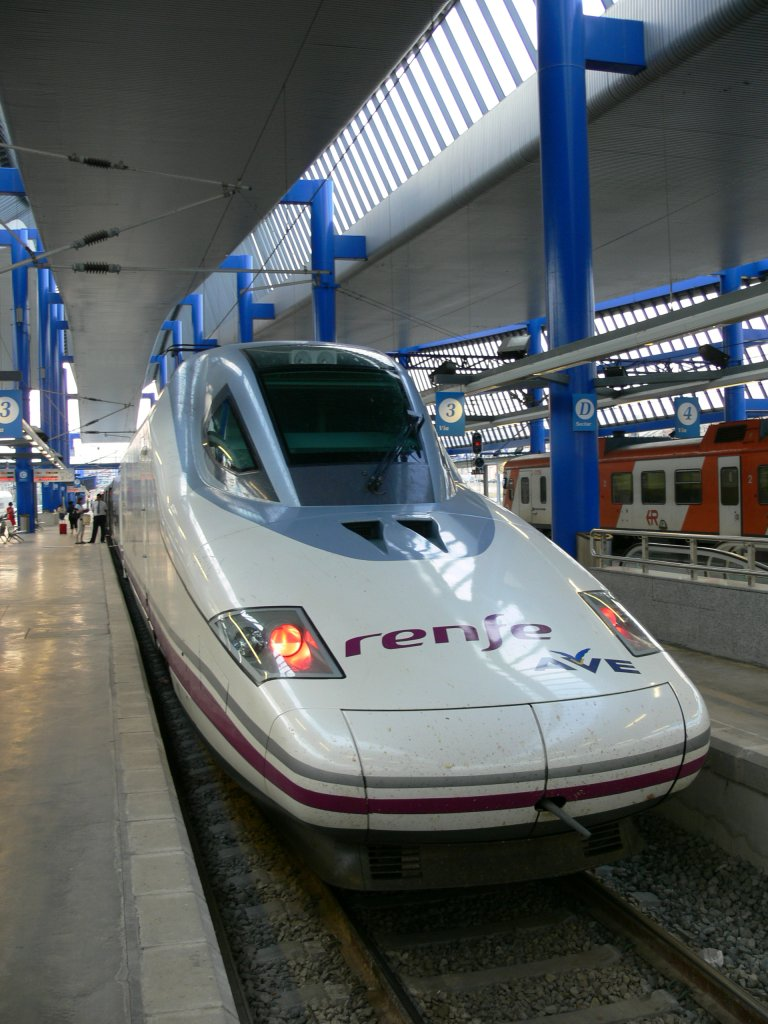
Talgo 350 train (Renfe Class 102) at Lleida Pirineus station

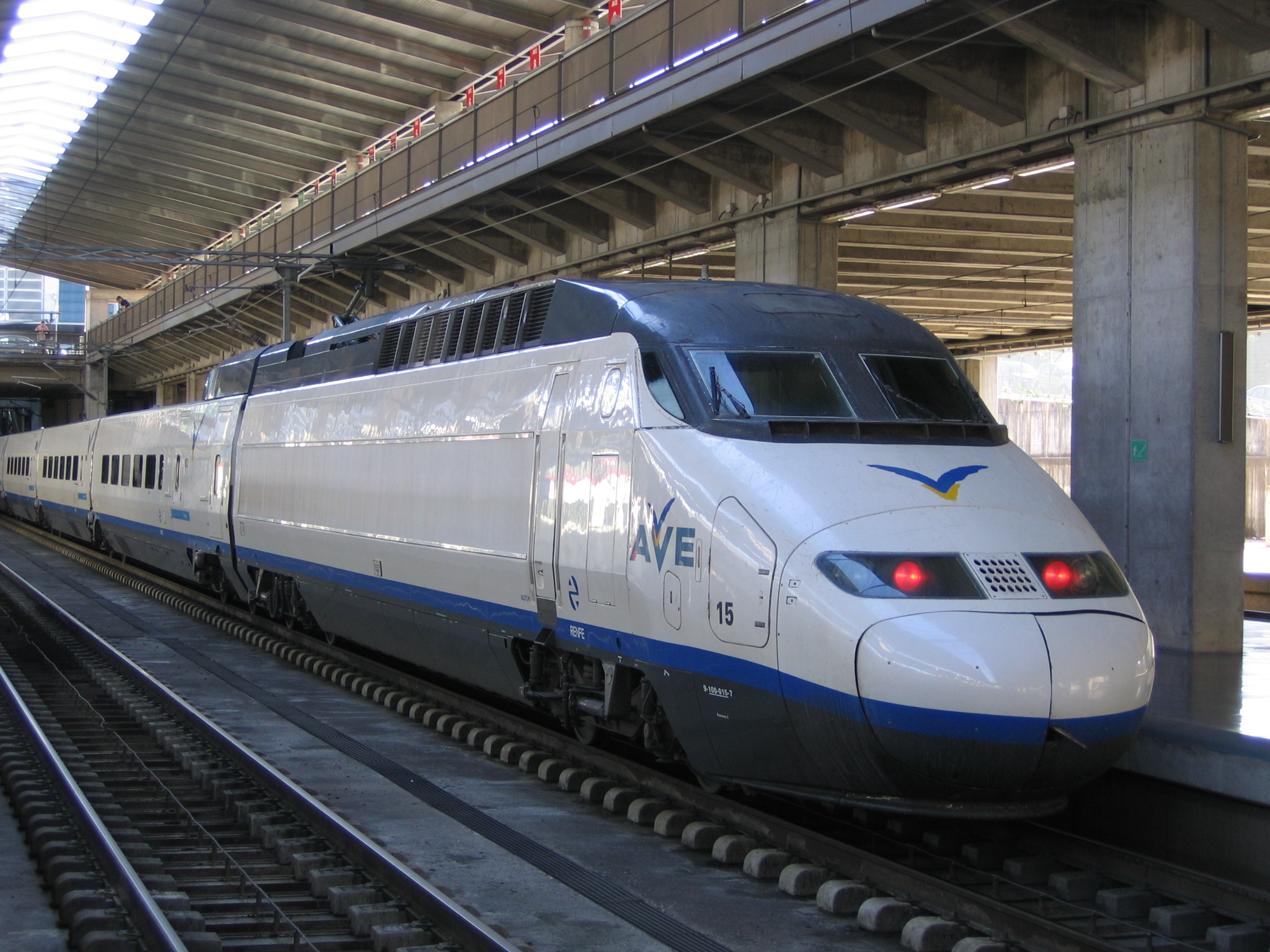
AVE "Alstom" (Renfe Class 100) trainset at Córdoba.

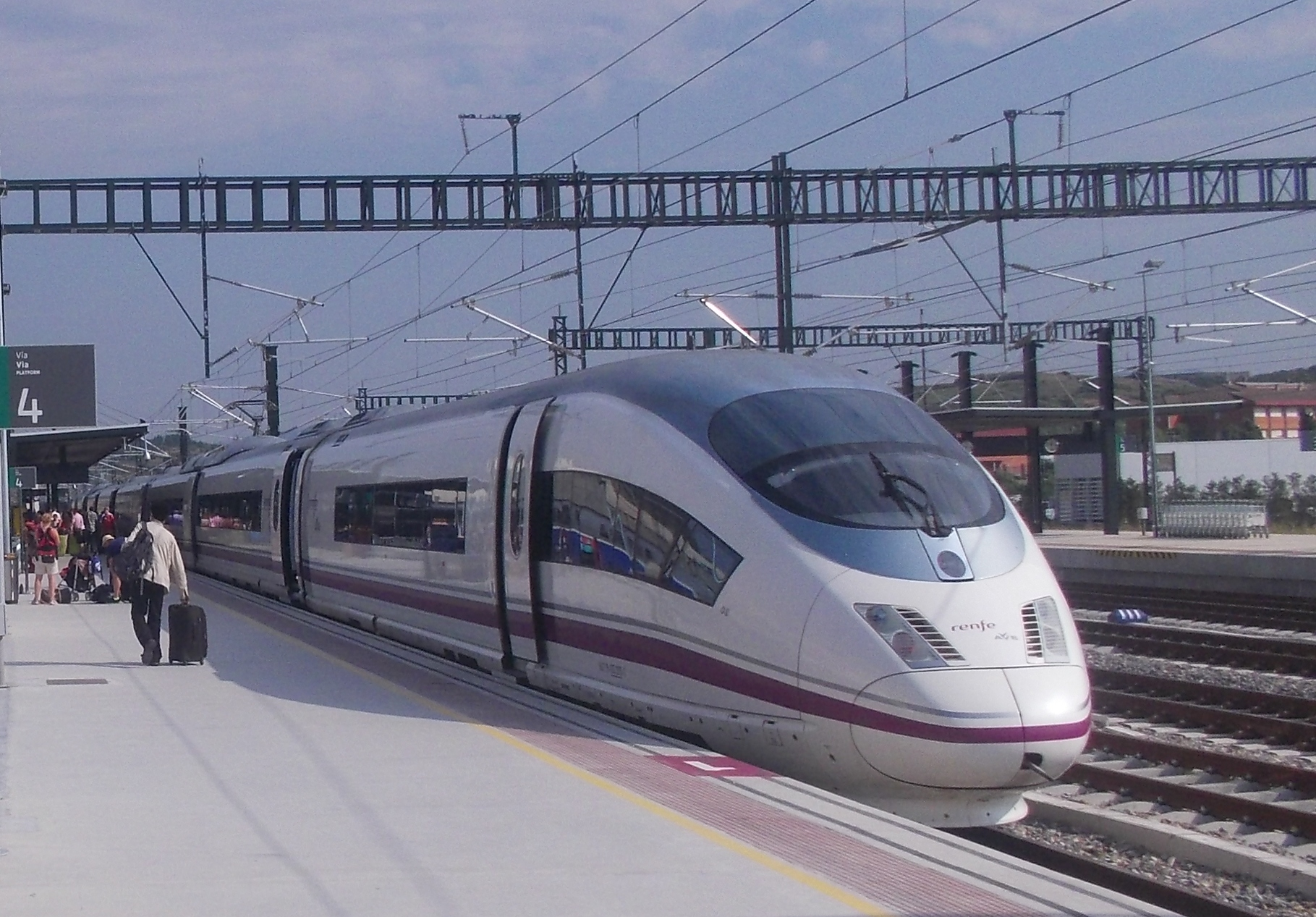
A RENFE AVE S-103 (Siemens Velaro E) at Figueres Vilafant railway station in 2013.

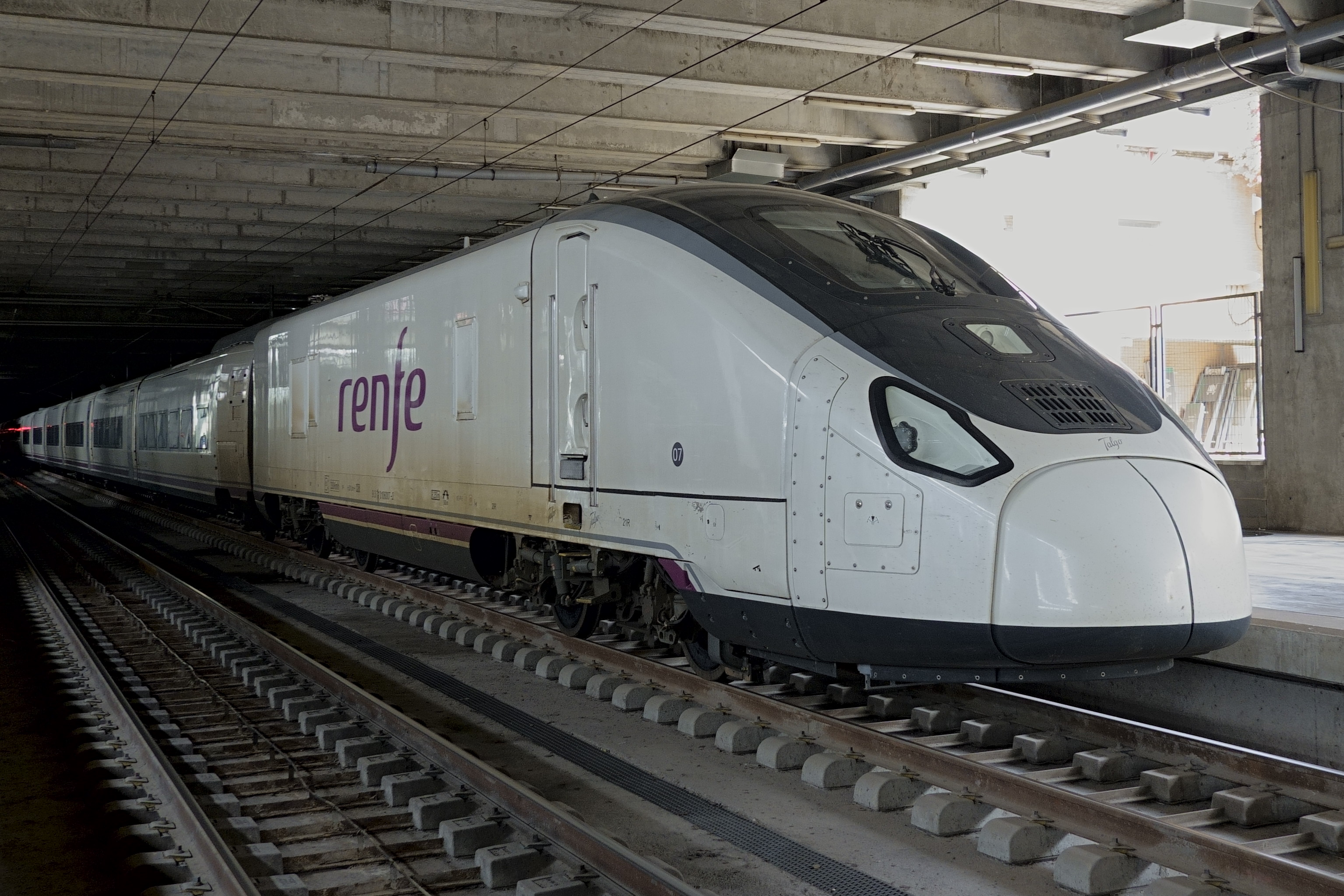
AVE Talgo Avril train (Renfe Class 106).

| Unit | Top speed | | Seating capacity | Number in Service | First built |
| Unit | km/h | mph | Seating capacity | Number in Service | First built |
|---|---|---|---|---|---|
| S-100 | 300 | 186 | 329 | 22 | 1991 |
| S-102 | 350 | 220 | 318 | 16 | 2005 |
| S-103 | 350 | 220 | 404 | 26 | 2007 |
| S-106 | 380 | 240 | > 500 735 (low cost version | 20 | 2012 |
| S-112 | 350 | 220 | 365 | 25 | 2010 |

== Passenger usage ==
The still-growing network transported a record 43.8 million passengers in 2025. Though the network length is extensive, it lags in ridership behind comparable high-speed rail systems in Japan, France, Germany, China, Taiwan, and Korea.

AVE passengers in millions from 2006 to 2024
| 2000s | | | | | | | 2006 | 2007 | 2008 | 2009 |
|---|---|---|---|---|---|---|---|---|---|---|
| 2000s | | | | | | | 4.878 | 5.559 | 11.461 | 11.250 |
| 2010s | 2010 | 2011 | 2012 | 2013 | 2014 | 2015 | 2016 | 2017 | 2018 | 2019 |
| 2010s | 10.851 | 12.563 | 12.101 | 14.697 | 17.967 | 19.428 | 20.352 | 21.108 | 21.332 | 22.370 |
| 2020s | 2020 | 2021 | 2022 | 2023 | 2024 | 2025 | 2026 | 2027 | 2028 | 2029 |
| 2020s | 7.603 | 12.282 | 23.562 | 31.784 | 39.019 | 43.786 | | | | |

View chart definition.

=== Rail infrastructure in Spain and Europe ===
- Rail transport in Spain
- High-speed rail in Spain
- High-speed rail in Europe
- Train categories in Europe

== Accidents and incidents ==
On 12 October 2026, an AVE caught fire at Ricla whilst operating a service from Madrid to Barcelona. All 283 passengers were evacuated.

On 28 October 2026, an AVE collided with an Iryo train near Urda, Toledo, causing two wagons to derail and causing at least 69 deaths, with the possibility of this increasing.

== See also ==
- Intermodalidad de Levante S.A.
