= High-speed rail in Spain =

Map showing high-speed railway lines in operation as of January 2025.

High-speed railways in Spain have been in operation since 1992 when the first line was opened connecting the cities of Madrid, Córdoba and Seville. Unlike the rest of the Iberian broad gauge network, the Spanish High-speed network mainly uses standard gauge. This permits direct connections to outside Spain through the link to the French network at the Perthus Tunnel. High-speed trains run on a network of high-speed rail track owned and managed by ADIF (Administrador de Infraestructuras Ferroviarias), where the dominant service is AVE while other high speed services such as Avant, Alvia, Avlo, Euromed, Ouigo España and Iryo, as well as mid-speed (InterCity) services also operate.

AVE trains are operated by Renfe, the national passenger high-speed rail operator in Spain, but other companies such as Ouigo España and Iryo compete on the Madrid–Barcelona and other routes in accordance with the European Union legislation. French TGV services run from the border to Barcelona under the TGV inOui brand. Alvia and Euromed trains are also operated by Renfe and have the ability to use both Iberian gauge and standard gauge lines offering high-speed services across the whole Spanish network.

As of July 2026, the Spanish high-speed rail network is the longest HSR network in Europe with 3,973 km (2,469 mi) and the second longest in the world, after China's.

== History ==
=== New rail link to Andalusia ===
Towards the end of the 1980s a new line was planned to join the Meseta Central with Andalusia without passing through the Despeñaperros pass. After considering various options it was decided that a standard-gauge line, allowing for Spain's first high-speed rail link, would be built. The project was named NAFA (Nuevo Acceso Ferroviario a Andalucía, New Rail Link to Andalusia) and was meant to help revitalise the stagnant southern Spanish economy. The line was inaugurated on 14 April 1992 to coincide with Expo 92 being held in Seville. Seven days later, on 21 April 1992 commercial AVE service began with six daily services stopping at Madrid, Seville, Córdoba, Puertollano and Ciudad Real.

In October 1992 Renfe began the AVE Lanzadera (Shuttle), a high-speed medium-distance service between Madrid, Ciudad Real and Puertollano, using spare class 100 trains.

It has been suggested that the PSOE government chose the French Alstom bid over the Siemens and Talgo bids for political rather than technical reasons, rewarding the French government for its assistance in capturing ETA activists who took sanctuary across the border in southern France. Seville's hosting of the 1992 World's Fair prompted the choice of that city for the inauguration of the first high-speed line, with its being the home town of then Spanish prime minister Felipe González also playing some role. Seville was the artistic, cultural, and financial capital of southern Spain and the fourth largest city in Spain, after Madrid, Barcelona and Valencia, with a population of over 700,000 and a metropolitan area of almost 1.5 million people. It is also the capital of Andalusia, Spain's most populous autonomous community (region).

In January 1993 the Talgo 200 Madrid–Málaga service began, using high-speed lines as far as Córdoba and then the Spanish-gauge Córdoba–Málaga railway to reach Málaga. On 23 April that year, an AVE trainset set a new top speed of 356.8 km/h (221.7 mph) on a test run. Later in 1993 the mixed-method services Talgo 200 Madrid–Cádiz and Talgo 200 Madrid–Huelva began.

In 1994 AVE trains on the Madrid–Seville line began to run at 300 km/h, cutting journey times by at least 40 minutes and covering the 471 km in 2 1/2 hours, though it is unlikely that much of a saving came from the increase in maximum speed, because only a small section of the line near Los Yébenes has the alignments for 300 km/h operation. The maximum permitted speed is 270 km/h between Atocha station and Brazatortas, save for the approaches to the intermediate stations (Atocha, Ciudad Real and Puertollano). Beyond Brazatortas, the line is only authorised for 250 km/h operation, which drops to 215 km/h in the Sierra Morena mountains and 90 km/h around Córdoba station. It is more likely that time savings occurred as a result of there being fewer intermediate stops.

Although Renfe began a mixed-service Talgo 200 Madrid–Algeciras route in 1999, this was, along with the other mixed services, transferred to Grandes Líneas Renfe (Renfe's Spanish gauge long-distance brand) following changes to plans for high-speed rail in Spain.

In November 2003 a new AVE Lanzadera medium distance service began between Seville and Córdoba using new class 104 trains, reducing journey times between the two cities to 40 minutes. In 2005 the brand was renamed RENFE Avant, and all those services started to use class 104 trains, leaving class 100 for the AVE services.

The construction of a 21-kilometre (13 mi) stretch of high-speed line from Madrid to Toledo allowed the inauguration of a medium-distance service in November 2005. The journey time between the two cities is now less than 30 minutes. The high-speed link, combined with high property prices in Madrid, has encouraged many Madrid commuters to settle in Ciudad Real, the first stop on the Madrid–Seville line. There has, however, been controversy over the construction of this line as the change to standard-gauge track meant that towns such as Getafe, Aranjuez and Algodor, which now have no commercial services, lost their direct services to Toledo. Furthermore, since Toledo is now connected by standard-gauge track it is impossible for other passenger or goods trains to reach it that have not come from other high-speed lines.

The last segment of the Madrid–Málaga high-speed rail line was completed on 23 December 2007 when the new high-speed railway section between the cities of Córdoba and Málaga was inaugurated. It is a standard-gauge railway line of 155 km in length and is designed for speeds of 350 km/h (217 mph). It has compatibility with neighboring countries' railway systems as well. The fastest AVE service between Madrid and Málaga takes 2 hours and 20 minutes. In February 2008 new long-distance AVE services were introduced on the Seville–Barcelona and Málaga–Barcelona routes, as well as a new Avant service on the Málaga–Córdoba–Seville route.

In October 2015 an extension of the Madrid-Seville high-speed rail line to Cádiz was completed after 14 years of works and put in service by Alvia trains for speeds up to 200 km/h. This section is built on Iberian gauge track that if European Rail Traffic Management System (ERTMS) railway signaling is installed in the line, with fewer stops between Seville and Cádiz, the maximum speed for the trains can be raised up to 250 km/h.

In 2019 the Antequera–Granada high-speed rail line opened at a total cost of €1.4 billion.

=== Madrid–Barcelona ===
The Madrid–Zaragoza–Barcelona line was inaugurated on 20 February 2008, after parts of the line had operated since 2003 (Madrid–Zaragoza–Lleida) and 2006 (Lleida–Tarragona). This line is currently one of the world's fastest long-distance trains in commercial operation, with non-stop trains covering the 621 km (386 mi) between the two cities in just 2 hours 30 minutes, and those calling at all stations in 3 hours 10 minutes. The line includes a spur railway that branches off at Zaragoza towards Huesca in north Aragon. The Madrid–Huesca high-speed rail line was inaugurated in 2005 and put in AVE service in September that year. In April 2008 the Avant service on the Barcelona–Camp de Tarragona–Lleida route was introduced. It was originally planned that in 2012 high-speed services would link Madrid and Barcelona with Paris-Gare de Lyon and later perhaps London St Pancras (using the Eurotunnel and the HS1 line).

The line currently terminates at Barcelona Sants railway station, but a new station is under construction at La Sagrera on the northern edge of the city. The Sants–La Sagrera tunnel links the Barcelona Sants station in Barcelona with the future Sagrera station through the Eixample district. The tunnel passes under and along the streets of Provença and Mallorca, while uses a short part under Diagonal avenue to link between these two streets. In the Carrer de Mallorca street, the tunnel passes directly in front of Gaudí's masterpiece, the basilica of the Sagrada Família, and in the Carrer de Provença street, near another Gaudí's architectural work, the Casa Milà. In a long campaign against this route, the Board of the Sagrada Família and other parties argued that the tunnel would damage the church, whose construction is still in progress. In this discussion about different possible routes, the one now built is also called the Provença tunnel because part of its route passes under the street of the same name.

The tunnel boring machine Barcino passed the Sagrada Família in October 2010, and reached its final destination a few months later. In March 2012, railway equipment was installed, with a special elastic isolation of the rails in order to dampen vibrations at the sections passing close to Gaudí's architectural works, using the Edilon system. Rail traffic was planned to start in 2012, initially without stops at the La Sagrera station, which was expected to be completed in 2016. The Sants–La Sagrera tunnel was finally inaugurated on 8 January 2013 along with the Perpignan–Barcelona high-speed rail line while commercial services via the tunnel towards France begun on the following day. However, works on the La Sagrera station were suspended in early 2014 due to a corruption scandal involving one of the companies carrying out the works. Construction works at the station were finally resumed in 2018 and the new AVE station is now expected to open to services by the end of 2026, although AVE trains have been passing through the station since the end of 2024.

=== Northern corridors ===
The first installment of a high-speed rail corridor in the north and north-west of Spain was the 179.6 km section Madrid–Segovia–Valladolid which was put in operation on 22 December 2007. It includes a tunnel of 28 kilometres (17 mi) at Guadarrama, which is the fourth longest train tunnel in Europe. Valladolid will become the hub for all AVE services connecting the north and north-west of Spain with the rest of the country.

Construction of the extension of the line towards the region of Asturias started in 2009 (except for Pajares Base Tunnel (variante de pajares) which started in 2003) and reached the city of Leon in 2015 with the inauguration of the 162.7 km Valladolid–Venta de Baños–Leon section on 29 September 2015. On 29 November 2023 the section Leon-La Robla-Pola de Lena was inaugurated after 20 years of works. On 21 May 2024 Renfe replaced the Madrid–Gijón and Castellón/Vinaros–Gijón Alvia services by AVE services on the first AVE gauge-changing Class 106 trains, able to operate at a max speed of 330 km/h or 205 mph with reduced journey times by 12 minutes between Madrid and Oviedo, and by 10 minutes between Madrid and Gijón.

On 24 April 2010, it was announced a 55 km high-speed spur would leave the Madrid–Valladolid route at Segovia and continue to Ávila. Initial plans were expected to be complete by the end of 2010, but as of 2024 this line remains in planning.

On 21 July 2022 a new 86.5 km section between Venta de Baños and Burgos was inaugurated after 13 years of works at an investment cost of 759 million euros and introduced a new AVE Madrid-Burgos service that cuts the journey time between the two cities down to just over an hour and a half. This section is the first expansion of the high-speed network to the north-northeast towards the Spanish region of the Basque Country and the future Basque high-speed railway line (Basque Y). It includes 2 tunnels and 12 viaducts; the longest of them passes over the Pisuerga river and Autovía A-62 highway.

In the north-west of Spain, the Madrid–Galicia high-speed rail line was completed on 21 December 2021 after 20 years of works when the Olmedo–Zamora–Santiago de Compostela section was finished. This line is connected to the Madrid–Asturias high-speed rail line at Olmedo south of Valladolid.

Construction on the 87.1 km northernmost part of this section between the cities of Ourense and Santiago de Compostela began in late 2004 and this part was inaugurated in December 2011. It was put in service along with the Santiago de Compostela–A Coruña section that was inaugurated in parallel. Since December 2011 the Avant service operates on the route Ourense–Santiago de Compostela–A Coruña by using S-121 trains and this is the first high-speed service offered by Renfe in the region of Galicia. The 107 km southern section, between Olmedo (130 km north of Madrid on the Madrid–Asturias line) and Zamora entered revenue service on 17 December 2015 by Alvia trains. The 110 km new built section in the middle between Zamora and Otero de Sanabria near the town of Puebla de Sanabria was put in service on 26 October 2020, while the 119.4 km last remaining part between Puebla de Sanabria and Ourense which crosses some of Spain's most remote and fragile nature areas, was completed in end 2021. Up to that date the entire line was served by Alvia S-730 (Patito, max speed 250 km/h (155 mph)) trains.

This line is linked in the region of Galicia to the 156 km Atlantic Axis high-speed rail line that connects the cities of Vigo and A Coruña via Santiago de Compostela. It is a new built Iberian gauge high-speed line designed for speeds up to 250 km/h and is due to be converted to standard gauge in the future. The Atlantic Axis was inaugurated in April 2015 while the section A Coruña–Santiago de Compostela opened in 2009 and was electrified in 2011. The new railway shortened the distance between the two cities by 22 km, from 178 km to 156 km, and cut the travel time from around 3 hours on the old railway down to 1 hour and 20 minutes on the new one. 37 tunnels totalling 59 km and 34 bridges totalling 15 km form part of the rebuilt railway.

Since 21 May 2024 AVE Madrid–Vigo and Madrid–La Coruña services on gauge-changing Class 106 trains are offered with reduced journey times by 18 minutes between Madrid and Santiago de Compostela and by 16 minutes between Madrid and Vigo compared to the previously Alvia services.

In June 2025, monthly rail transport between Galicia and Madrid surpassed air transport in passenger numbers for the first time (181,588 passengers by train versus 155,715 by plane, compared to 20,000 versus 180,000 respectively in 2011).

=== Eastern corridors ===
The Madrid–Levante network connects Madrid with the Mediterranean coast of the Levante Region (Eastern Spain). The Madrid–Cuenca–Valencia line was officially finished on Friday, 10 December 2010, with commercial trips starting on Saturday 18 December 2010. Five days later, on 15 December 2010, the inauguration of the Cuenca–Albacete branch took place. Those two lines form the first sections of the Madrid–Levante high-speed rail network. Since then non-stop AVE trains between Madrid and Valencia cover the 391 km (243 mi) in 1 hour 38 minutes.

In June 2011, Renfe announced they would suppress the three daily high-speed trains between Toledo, Cuenca and Albacete because of lack of passengers despite an investment of 3.5 billion euros (this figure includes the full Madrid–Levante railway network construction costs, with its later extensions to Alicante and Murcia). Some media stated that the average number of daily passengers was 9 between Toledo and Albacete and 6 between Toledo and Cuenca while the daily cost was 18,000 euros, while official figures gave us an average of 403–464 daily passengers. Those trains ran over existing high speed lines (the lines to Toledo, Seville and Valencia) and so services to those cities remain open, but passengers traveling between Toledo and other destinations had to change trains at Madrid. However, in 2022, as the Madrid–Cuenca–Valencia conventional railway was closed, direct high-speed trains between Toledo, Cuenca and Albacete have been reinstated, this time operated as Avant services, catering better to the needs of passengers than the AVE trains that operated since 2011.

The Madrid–Albacete–Alicante line was inaugurated on 18 June 2013. Trains cover the distance between Madrid and Alicante in 2 hours 12 minutes. In the same year the Avant service between Requena-Utiel and Valencia was introduced.

On 22 January 2018 the extension section of the line to Castellón was inaugurated, introducing a new AVE service, Madrid-Castellón, which cut the journey time between the two cities by an additional 30 minutes for a total of 2 hours and 25 minutes.

The first stretch of the AVE service from Madrid to Murcia was inaugurated on 1 February 2021, linking Monforte del Cid, Elche and Orihuela, while the continuation up to Murcia put in service on 20 December 2022. Work is being prepared to extend the line to Cartagena. When fully operational the Madrid–Levante network will total 955 km of high-speed rail connecting Madrid, Cuenca, Albacete, Valencia, Alicante, Elche, Castellón, Murcia and Cartagena.

=== International connection with France ===
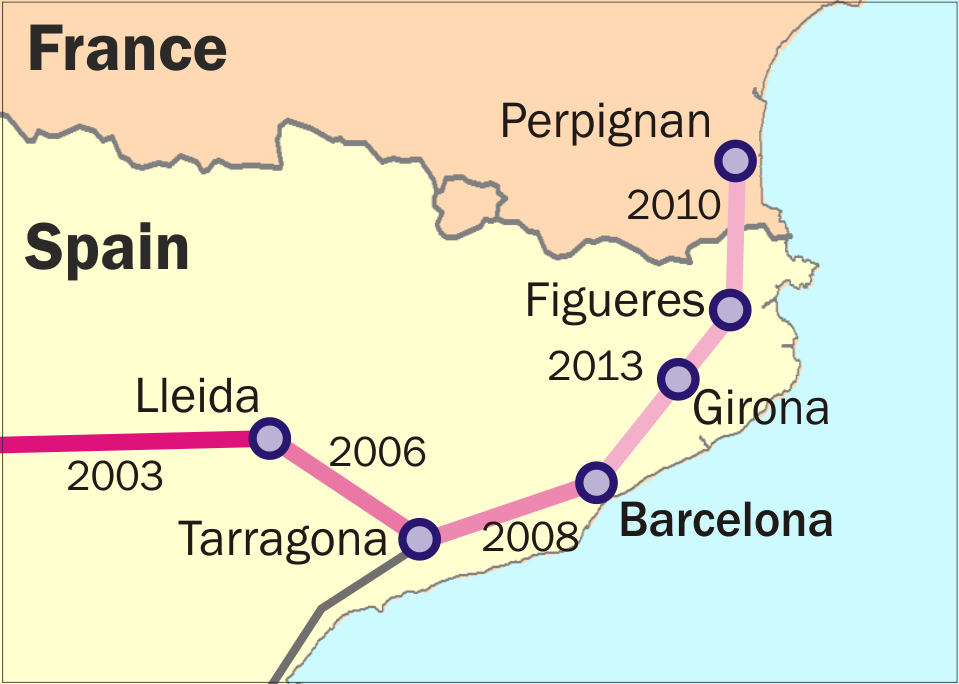
Map showing the evolution of the high-speed rail interconnection between Spain and France

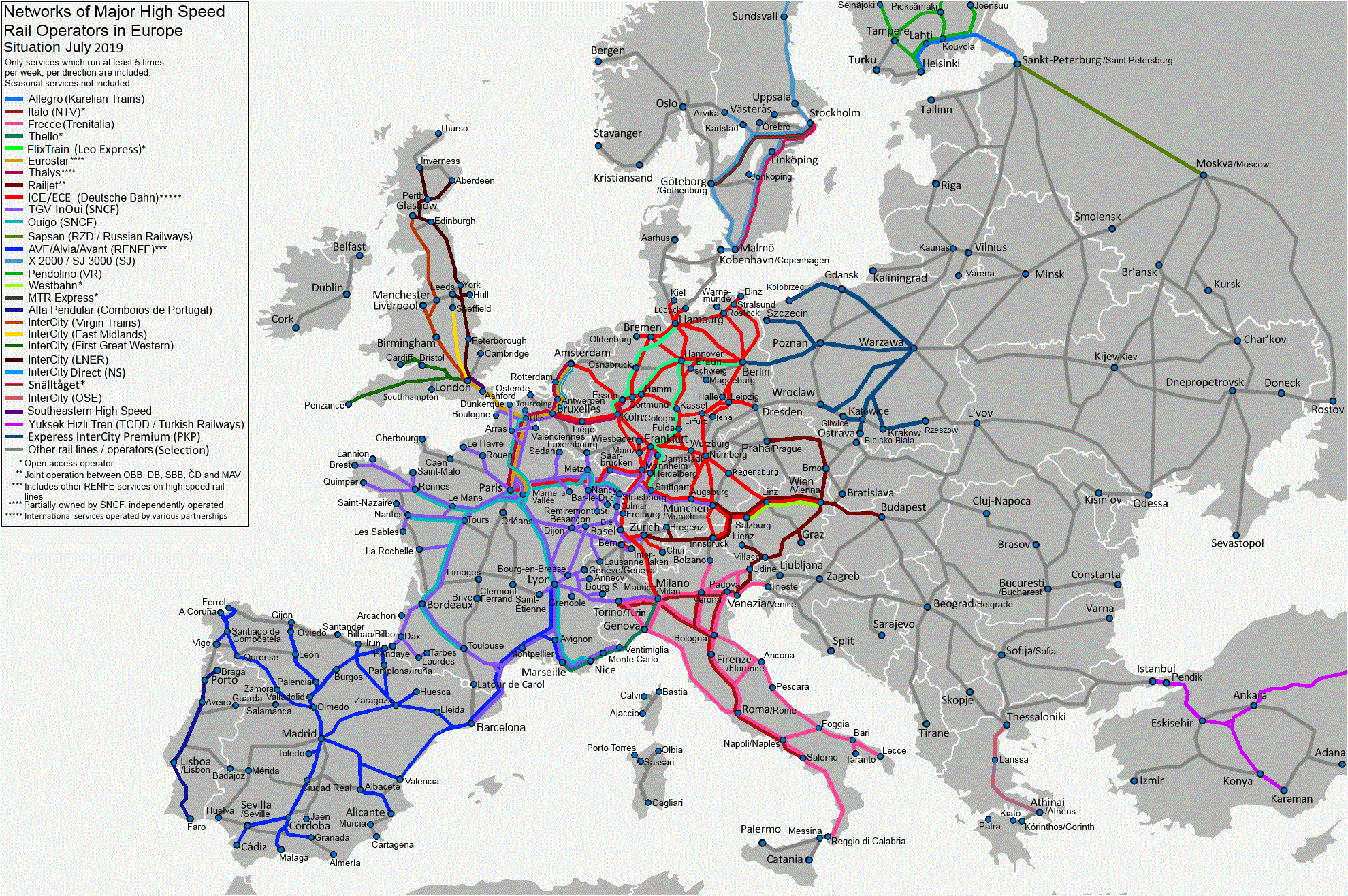
Networks of major high-speed rail operators in Europe

An important milestone for the Spanish high-speed network was reached in December 2013 when it was connected to the rest of Europe via France. The connecting link was the construction of the 131-kilometre (81.4 mi) Barcelona–Figueres section of the Perpignan–Barcelona high-speed line, an extension of the Madrid–Barcelona line, completed in January 2013 at a cost of €3.7 billion. The international 44.5-kilometre (27.7 mi) Perpignan–Figueres section of the line opened in December 2010 and includes the new 8.3-kilometre (5.2 mi) Perthus Tunnel under the Pyrenees.

The high-speed Barcelona–Figueres section (from Barcelona to the French border) was officially inaugurated on 7 January 2013. Since then AVE services connect Madrid directly to Girona and Figueres via Barcelona and Avant services are offered on the Barcelona–Girona–Figueres route. The journey from the centre of Barcelona to the centre of Girona takes now 37 minutes (compared to the previous 90 minutes), and to Figueres in 53 minutes (instead of two hours). Girona and Figueres are now 14 minutes from each other.

In December 2013 the first international high-speed services between Spanish and French cities were introduced by Renfe and SNCF. One previously non-high-speed section on the French side, between Montpellier and Nîmes, opened in July 2018, allowing almost continuous high-speed travel from the French high-speed network to the Spanish one. The French government, on the other hand, later announced indefinite delays to the Montpellier-Perpignan high speed section that was originally planned for 2020.

=== Madrid interconnector ===
On 24 April 2010, tunnelling started on the 7.3 km route connecting the 2 main stations in Madrid, Madrid Atocha and Madrid Chamartín. Electrification works for the line along with line duplication works in the section between Atocha and Torrejón de Velasco started in 2017 and these works were expected to be completed in early 2018 and the line was hoped to open for commercial service for AVE trains within the same year. A later announcement postponed the opening for the second half of 2020. However, delays in the schedule due to the COVID-19 pandemic postponed it further. In November 2021, the inauguration of the interconnector was projected to the first trimester of 2022. Test runs were being conducted in early February 2022, and the line was expected to be ready for permit application in early March. The tunnel finally opened on July 1, 2022.

Before this all trains going towards Valladolid left from Chamartín and trains going to Seville, Málaga, Valencia, Alicante and Barcelona left from Atocha station. Also, there is a single daily service in each direction running along the Barcelona–Seville, Barcelona–Málaga, and Barcelona-Granada routes, which uses the high-speed bypass around Madrid to avoid reversing the direction of train in Atocha station. The tunnel now allows services serving northern cities to travel non-stop or with a stop through Madrid and onward to southern cities (or vice versa), without the driver having to change ends or bypass Madrid, a valuable source of passengers. Previously someone wanting to travel from Valladolid to Alicante, for instance, had to travel from Valladolid Campo Grande station to Madrid Chamartín station before taking a Cercanías service to Atocha; then finally taking an onward train to Alicante.

=== Incidents and accidents ===
- Santiago de Compostela derailment
- Euromed 2002 accident
- 2026 Adamuz train derailments
- 2026 Toledo train collision

== Operational services ==
Map showing high-speed services on high-speed and conventional lines (January 2025). Blue: high-speed lines; red: conventional Iberian gauge lines

The Spanish high-speed network is used, among others, by the following services:

- International TGV inOui:
  - Barcelona–Paris via Girona, Figueres, Perpignan, Narbonne, Béziers, Agde, Sète, Montpellier, Nîmes, and Valence
- International AVE:
  - Barcelona–Lyon via Girona, Figueres, Perpignan, Narbonne, Montpellier, Nîmes, and Valence
  - Madrid–Marseille via Guadalajara, Zaragoza, Tarragona, Barcelona, Girona, Figueres, Perpignan, Narbonne, Béziers, Montpellier, Nîmes, Avignon and Aix-en-Provence
- AVE:
  - Alicante–León via Albacete, Cuenca, Madrid Chamartín, Valladolid and Palencia
  - Alicante–Ourense via Albacete, Cuenca, Madrid Chamartín and Zamora
  - Barcelona–Granada via Tarragona, Lleida, Zaragoza, Ciudad Real, Puertollano, Córdoba and Antequera
  - Barcelona–Málaga via Tarragona, Lleida, Zaragoza, Ciudad Real, Puertollano, Córdoba, Puente Genil-Herrera and Antequera
  - Barcelona–Seville via Tarragona, Lleida, Zaragoza, Ciudad Real, Puertollano and Córdoba (trains with selective stops are also scheduled)
  - Burgos–Murcia via Valladolid, Segovia, Madrid-Chamartín, Elche and Orihuela
  - Gijón–Castellón via Oviedo, Mieres Del Camín, La Pola, León, Palencia, Valladolid, Segovia, Madrid, Cuenca, Requena Utiel, Valencia and Sagunt
  - Gijón–Vinaros via Oviedo, Mieres Del Camín, La Pola, León, Palencia, Valladolid, Segovia, Madrid, Cuenca, Valencia, Sagunto, Castellón, Benicàssim, Oropesa del Mar and Benicarló (only in summertime)
  - Huesca–Seville via Tardienta, Zaragoza, Calatayud, Guadalajara, Madrid-Puerta de Atocha and Córdoba
  - Madrid–A Coruña via Zamora, Ourense and Santiago de Compostela
  - Madrid–Alicante via Cuenca, Albacete, and Villena (non stop trains and trains with selective stops are also scheduled)
  - Madrid–Barcelona via Guadalajara, Calatayud, Zaragoza, Lleida, and Tarragona (non stop trains and trains with selective stops are also scheduled)
  - Madrid–Castellón via Cuenca, Requena-Utiel and Valencia
  - Madrid–Figueres via Guadalajara, Calatayud, Zaragoza, Lleida, Tarragona, Barcelona and Girona (trains are scheduled with selective stops)
  - Madrid–Gijón via Valladolid, Palencia, León and Oviedo
  - Madrid–Granada via Ciudad Real, Puertollano, Córdoba, Puente Genil-Herrera, Antequera and Loja (trains with selective stops are also scheduled)
  - Madrid–Huesca via Guadalajara, Calatayud, Zaragoza, and Tardienta
  - Madrid–León via Segovia, Valladolid and Palencia
  - Madrid–Málaga via Ciudad Real, Puertollano, Córdoba, Puente Genil-Herrera and Antequera (non stop trains and trains with selective stops are also scheduled)
  - Madrid–Murcia via Elche and Orihuela (some trains are arriving to Alicante and then reversing towards Murcia)
  - Madrid–Ourense via Zamora
  - Madrid–Seville via Ciudad Real, Puertollano, and Córdoba (non stop trains and trains with selective stops are also scheduled)
  - Madrid–Valencia via Cuenca and Requena-Utiel (non stop trains are also scheduled)
  - Madrid–Vigo via Zamora, Sanabria, A Gudiña, Ourense, Santiago de Compostela, Vilagarcía de Arousa and Pontevedra (trains with selective stops are also scheduled)
  - Málaga–Murcia via Madrid-Puerta de Atocha, Cuenca, Albacete, Villena, Alicante, Elche and Orihuela
  - Valencia–Burgos via Requena-Utiel, Cuenca, Madrid Chamartín and Valladolid (trains with selective stops are also scheduled)
  - Valencia–León via Requena-Utiel, Cuenca, Madrid-Chamartín, Segovia, Valladolid and Palencia (trains with selective stops are also scheduled)
  - Valencia–Seville via Cuenca, Ciudad Real, Puertollano, and Córdoba
- AVANT (mid distance):
  - A Coruña–Santiago de Compostela–Ourense
  - Badajoz–Cáceres
  - Barcelona–Girona
  - Barcelona–Girona–Figueres
  - Barcelona–Tarragona–Lleida
  - Barcelona–Tarragona–Tortosa
  - Calatayud–Zaragoza
  - Granada–Córdoba–Seville via Loja, Antequera and Puente Genil-Herrera
  - Madrid–Ciudad Real–Puertollano
  - Madrid–Segovia–Valladolid
  - Madrid–Toledo
  - Málaga–Córdoba–Seville via Antequera and Puente Genil-Herrera
  - Málaga–Granada via Antequera and Loja
  - Murcia–Alicante via Beniel, Orihuela, Callosa Cox and Elx
  - Ourense–Santiago de Compostela–A Coruña
  - Toledo–Madrid–Albacete via Cuenca
  - Valencia–Requena Utiel
- ALVIA (mixed high-speed/conventional):
  - Alicante–Santander via Villena, Albacete, Cuenca, Madrid, Segovia, Valladolid, Palencia and Torrelavega
  - Barcelona–A Coruña via Lleida, Zaragoza, Pamplona, Vitoria-Gasteiz, Burgos, León, Ponferrada, Ourense and Santiago de Compostela
  - Barcelona–Bilbao via Camp Tarragona, Lleida, Zaragoza, Tudela, Castejon, Calahorra, Logroño, Haro and Miranda De Ebro
  - Barcelona–San Sebastián via Camp Tarragona, Lleida, Zaragoza, Tudela, Castejon, Tafalla, Pamplona, Altsasu and Zumarraga
  - Barcelona–Salamanca via Camp Tarragona, Lleida, Zaragoza, Tudela, Castejon, Tafalla, Pamplona, Vitoria-Gasteiz, Miranda de Ebro, Burgos, Valladolid and Medina del Campo
  - Barcelona–Vigo via Lleida, Zaragoza, Pamplona, Vitoria-Gasteiz, Burgos, León, Ponferrada and Ourense, with connection services to Gijón in León and to A Coruña in Monforte de Lemos
  - Gijón–Alicante via Oviedo, Mieres Del Camín, La Pola, León, Palencia, Valladolid, Segovia, Madrid, Cuenca, Albacete and Villena
  - Madrid–Algeciras via Ciudad Real, Puertollano, Córdoba, Antequera, Ronda and San Roque-la Línea
  - Madrid–Almeria, via Córdoba, Antequera, Granada and Guadix
  - Madrid–Avilés via Palencia, León, Mieres Del Camín and Oviedo
  - Madrid–Badajoz via Leganés, Torrijos, Talavera De La Reina, Oropesa, Navalmoral De La Mata, Monfragüe-plasencia, Cáceres and Mérida
  - Madrid–Bilbao via Segovia, Valladolid, Burgos and Miranda de Ebro
  - Madrid–Cádiz via Ciudad Real, Puertollano, Córdoba, Sevilla and Jerez de la Frontera
  - Madrid–Ferrol via Segovia, Medina del Campo, Zamora, Sanabria, A Gudiña, Ourense, Santiago de Compostela, A Coruña, Betanzos and Pontedeume
  - Madrid–Huelva via Córdoba and La Palma Del Condado
  - Madrid–Irun via Segovia, Valladolid, Burgos, Miranda de Ebro, Vitoria-Gasteiz, Zumarraga, Tolosa and San Sebastián
  - Madrid–Logroño via Guadalajara, Calatayud, Tudela and Calahorra
  - Madrid–Lugo via Segovia, Medina del Campo, Zamora, Sanabria, A Gudiña, Ourense, Monforte De Lemos and Sarria
  - Madrid–Pamplona via Guadalajara, Calatayud, Tudela and Tafalla
  - Madrid–Salamanca via Segovia and Medina del Campo
  - Madrid–Santander via Valladolid, Palencia, Aguilar De Campoo, Reinosa and Torrelavega
  - Madrid–Vigo via Segovia, Medina del Campo, Zamora, Sanabria, A Gudiña, Ourense, Vilagarcía de Arousa and Pontevedra (trains with selective stops are also scheduled)
- Euromed (mixed high-speed/conventional):
  - Barcelona–Valencia via Tarragona and Castellón
  - Barcelona–Alicante via Tarragona, Castellón and Valencia
  - Figueres–Valencia via Girona, Tarragona, Barcelona and Castellón
  - Figueres–Alicante via Girona, Tarragona, Barcelona, Castellón and Valencia
- Avlo (low cost high-speed):
  - Madrid–A Coruña via Segovia, Medina Del Campo, Zamora, Sanabria, A Gudiña, Ourense and Santiago de Compostela
  - Madrid–Alicante via Cuenca, Albacete and Villena
  - Madrid–Gijón via Valladolid, Palencia, León, La Pola, Mieres Del Camín and Oviedo
  - Madrid–Málaga via Ciudad Real, Puertollano, Villanueva De Córdoba, Córdoba, Puente Genil-Herrera and Antequera
  - Madrid–Murcia via Cuenca, Albacete, Villena, Alicante, Elche and Orihuela
  - Madrid–Seville via Ciudad Real, Puertollano, Villanueva De Córdoba and Córdoba
  - Madrid–Valencia via Cuenca and Requena-Utiel
  - Madrid–Vigo via Segovia, Medina Del Campo, Zamora, Sanabria, A Gudiña, Ourense, Santiago De Compostela, Vilagarcía de Arousa and Pontevedra
  - Murcia–Valladolid via Orihuela, Elche, Alicante, Villena, Albacete, Cuenca and Madrid Chamartín
  - Valladolid–Alicante via Madrid Chamartín, Cuenca, Albacete and Villena
- Iryo (private high-speed operator):
  - Madrid–Alicante via Albacete
  - Madrid–Barcelona via Zaragoza and Tarragona
  - Madrid–Málaga via Córdoba
  - Madrid–Seville via Córdoba
  - Madrid–Valencia via Cuenca
- Ouigo España (private high-speed operator):
  - Alicante–Valladolid via Albacete, Madrid and Segovia
  - Madrid–Alicante via Albacete
  - Madrid–Barcelona via Zaragoza and Tarragona
  - Madrid–Murcia via Albacete and Elche
  - Madrid–Valencia via Cuenca
  - Madrid–Valladolid via Segovia

== Trains ==
Currently, there are several series of high-speed trains that run the AVE service:

- S-100, manufactured by Alstom
- S-102, manufactured by Talgo and Bombardier, marketed globally as Talgo 350
- S-103, manufactured by Siemens, marketed globally under the brand Siemens Velaro
- S-106, manufactured by Talgo, marketed globally as Talgo AVRIL, also used by the Avlo service
- S-112, manufactured by Talgo and Bombardier, also used by the Avlo service

There are other series of trains that are considered high-speed and run under the brands Alvia, Euromed and Avant, and are variable gauge trains. Those can run on high-speed lines at a maximum of 250 km/h (155 mph), and can also change between standard- and Iberian-gauge lines without stopping. The trains that are operated under the Alvia, Euromed and Avant brands are:

- Avant S-104, manufactured by Alstom and CAF
- Avant S-114, manufactured by Alstom and CAF
- Avant S-121, manufactured by CAF and Alstom
- Alvia S-120, manufactured by CAF and Alstom
- Alvia/Euromed S-130, manufactured by Talgo and Bombardier
- Alvia S-730, manufactured by Talgo and Bombardier

The high-speed trains that run the Ouigo España service are:

- TGV Duplex, manufactured by Alstom

The high-speed trains that run the Iryo service are:

- Frecciarossa 1000, manufactured by Hitachi Rail Italy and Alstom
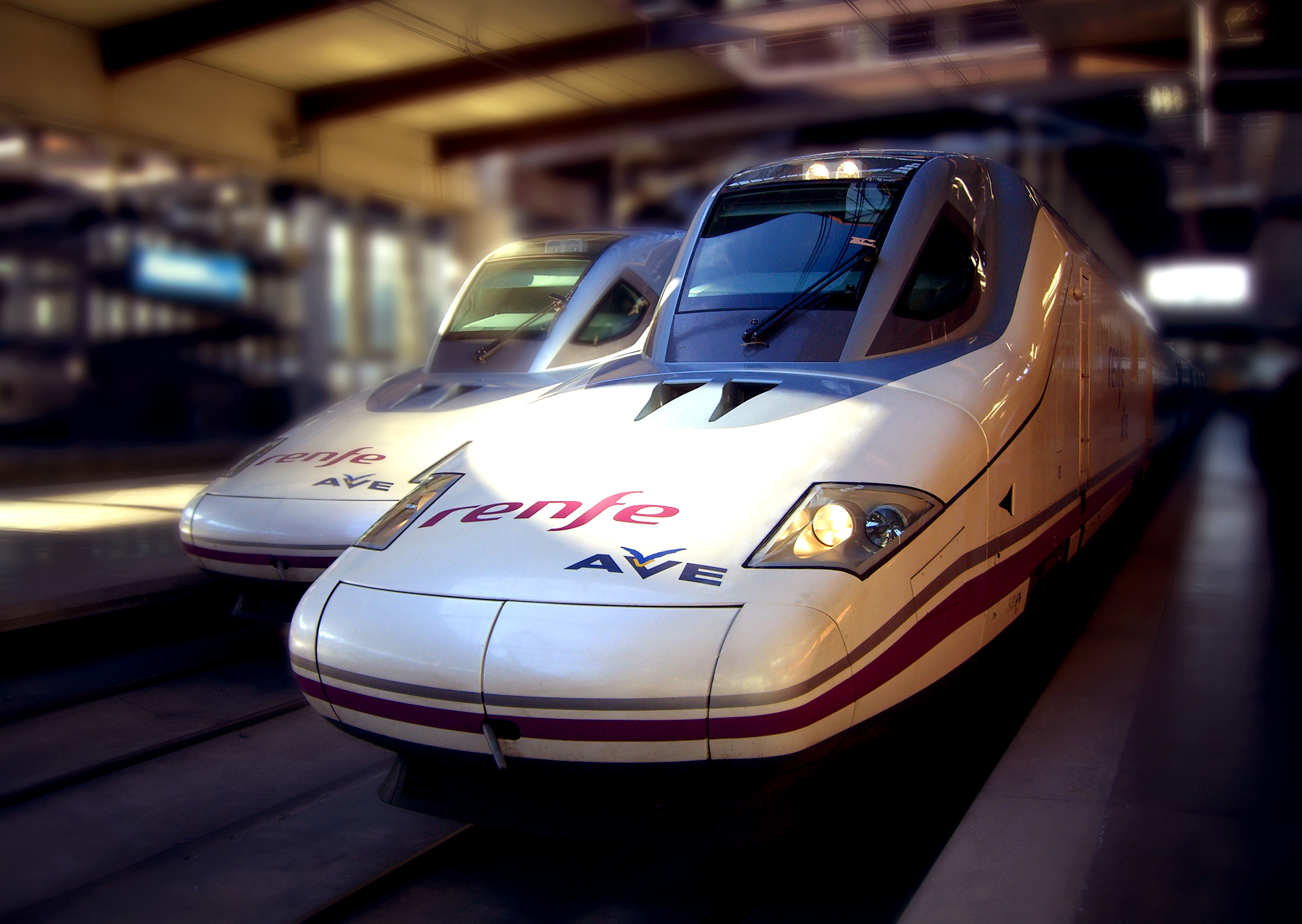
A Talgo 350 train (Renfe Class 102) at Madrid Atocha station.

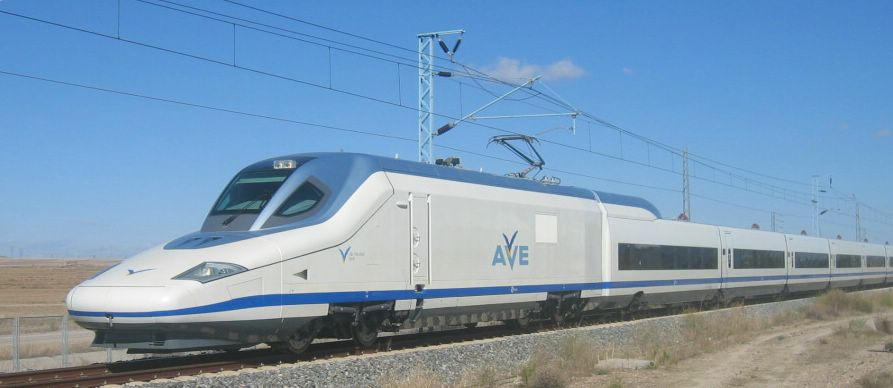
AVE train Talgo 350 (Renfe Class 102).

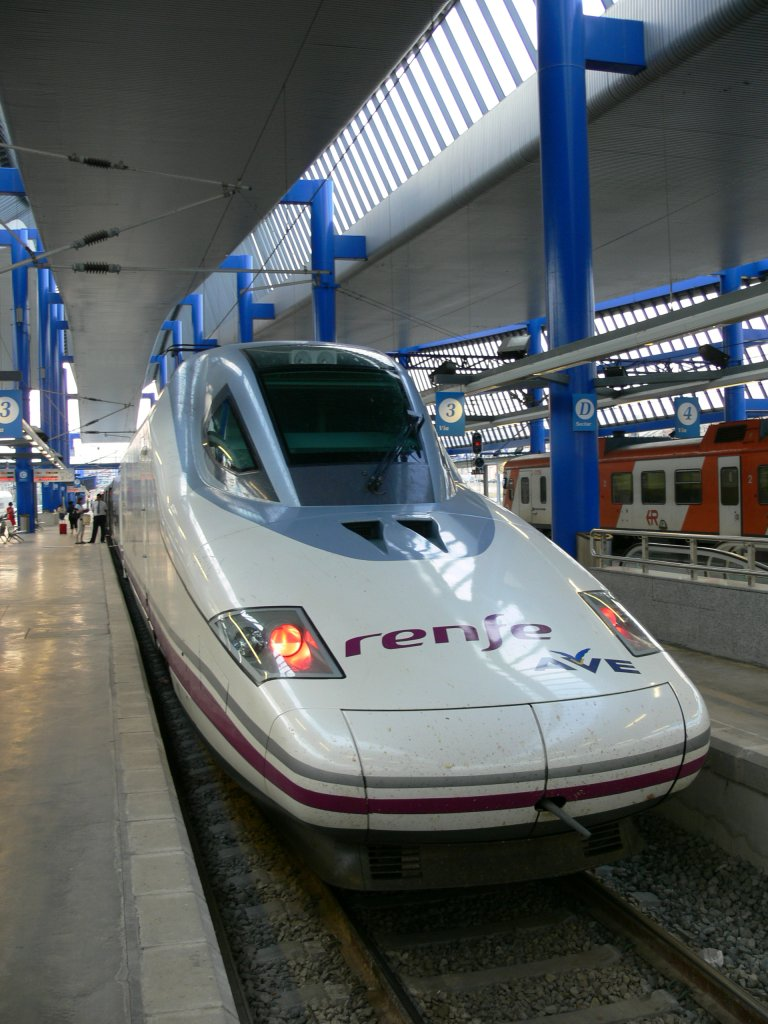
Talgo 350 train (Renfe Class 102) at Lleida Pirineus station

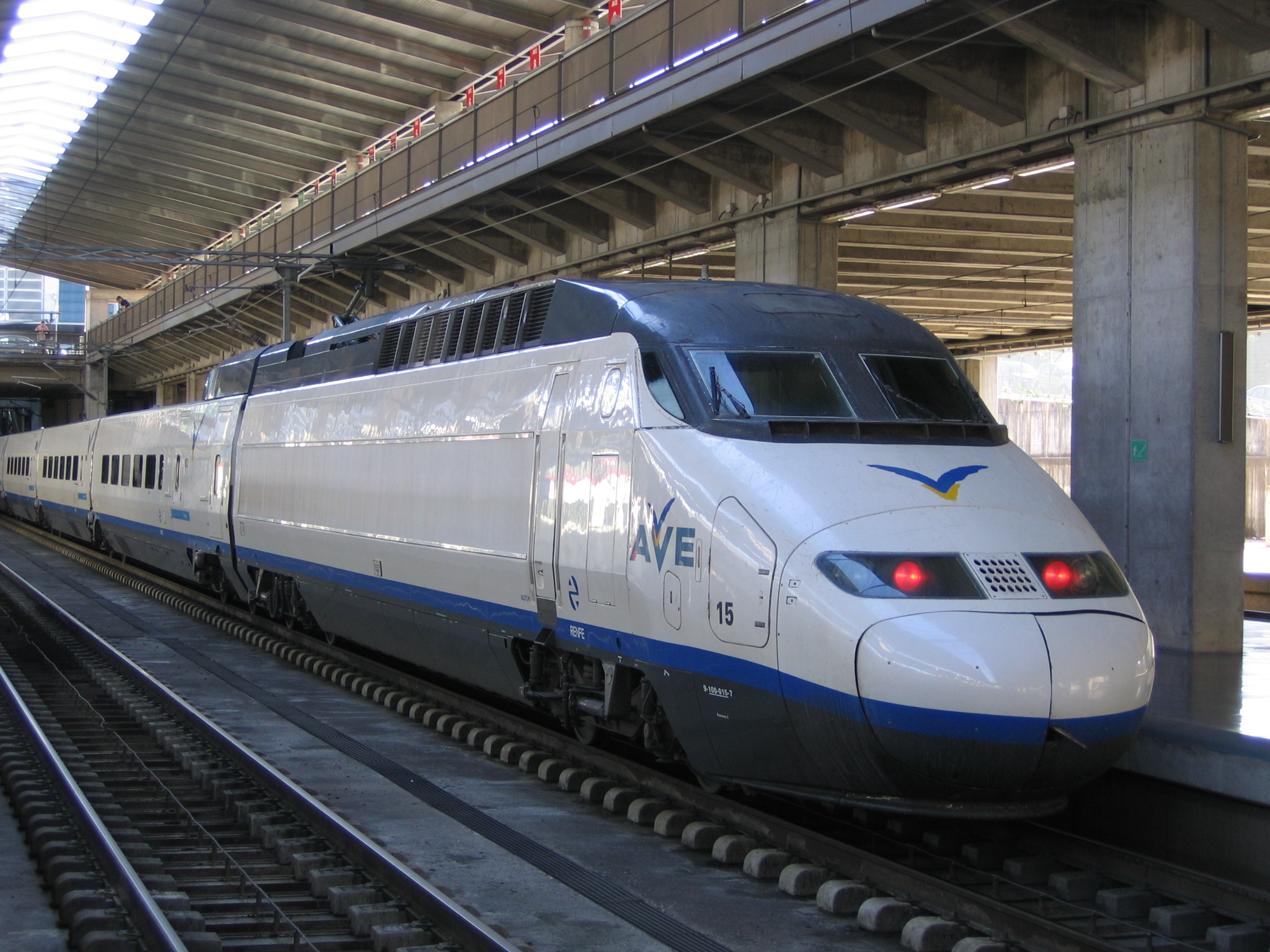
AVE "Alstom" (Renfe Class 100) trainset at Córdoba.

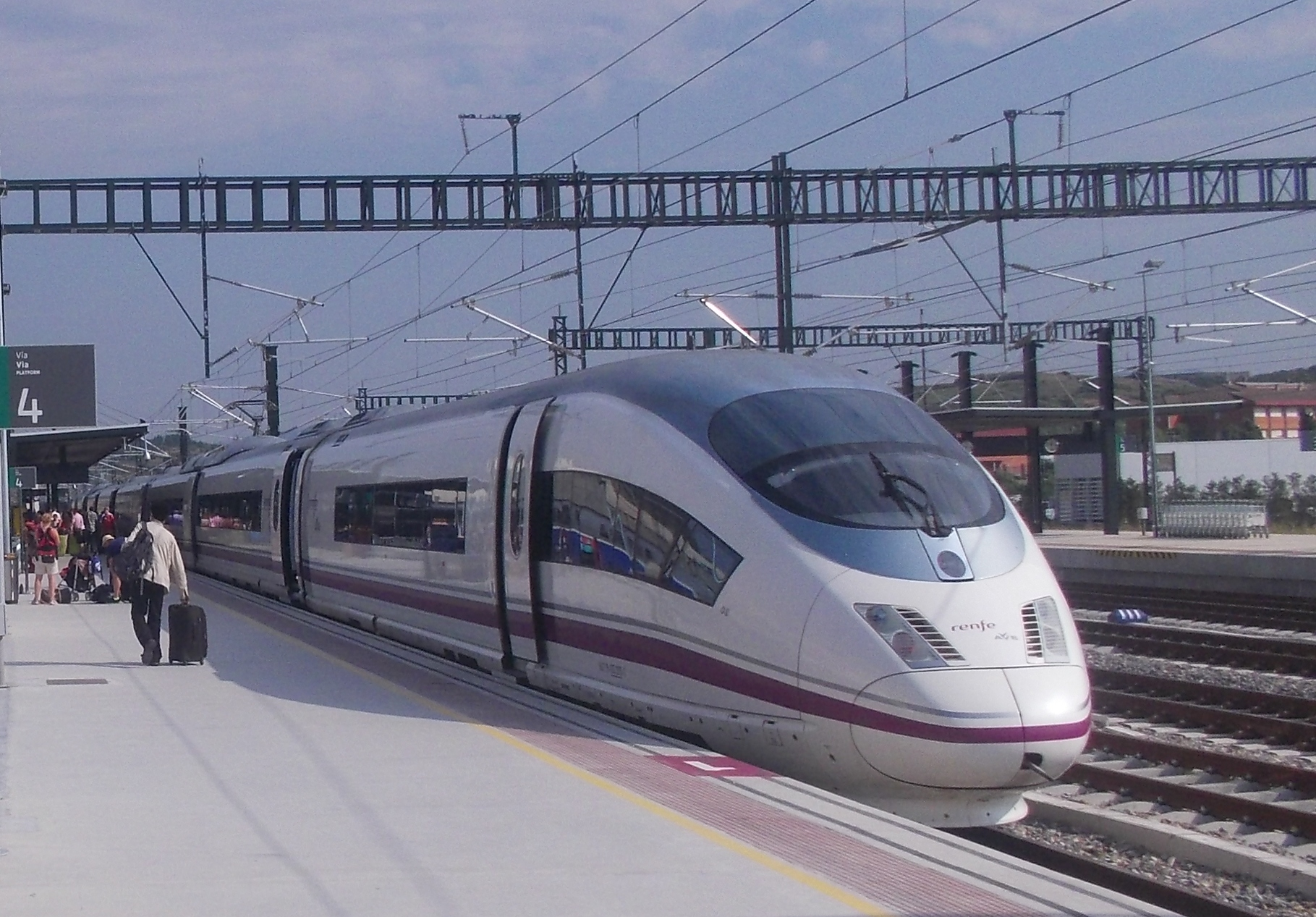
A RENFE AVE S-103 (Siemens Velaro E) at Figueres Vilafant railway station in 2013.

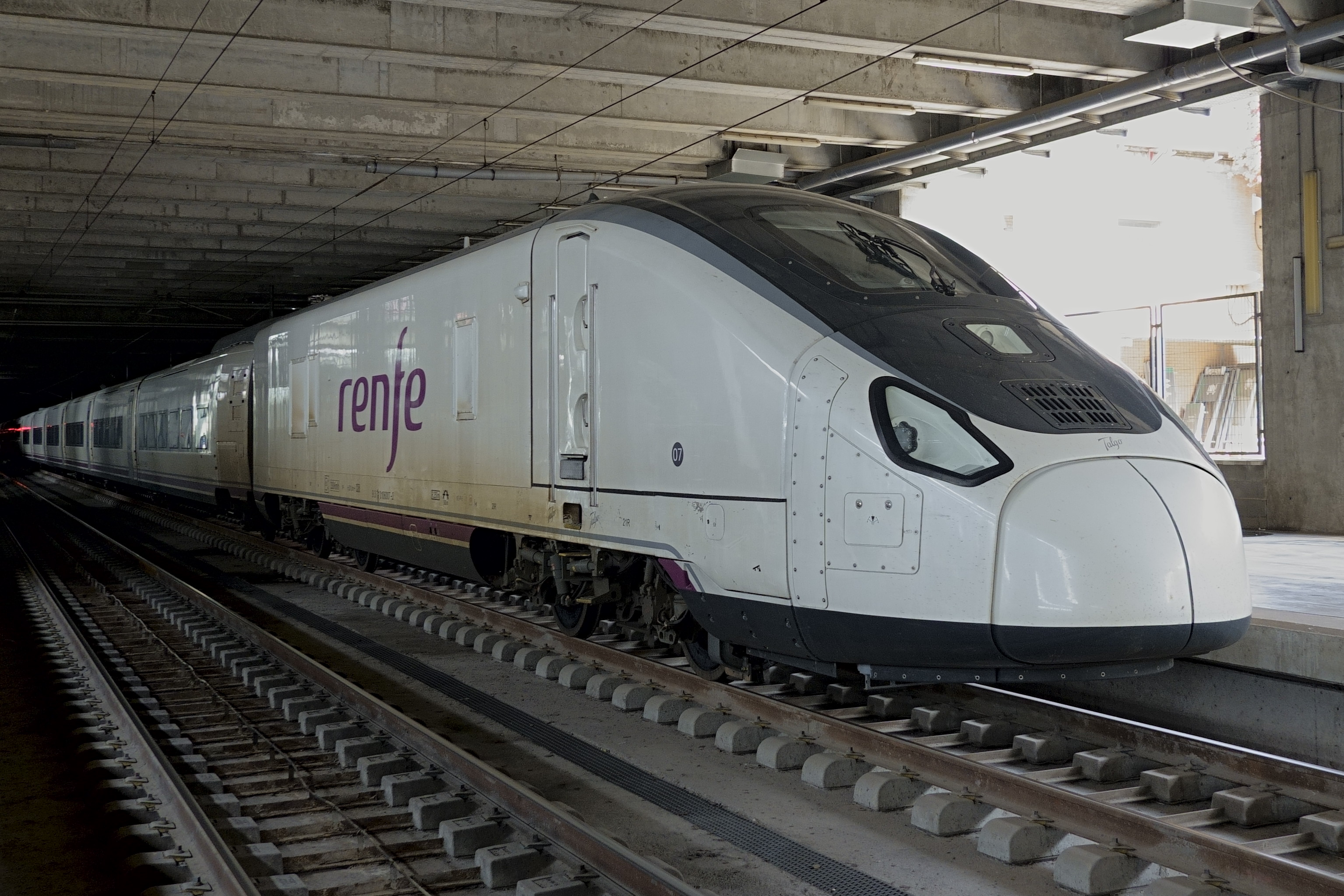
An AVE Talgo AVRIL train (Renfe Class 106) at Córdoba station .

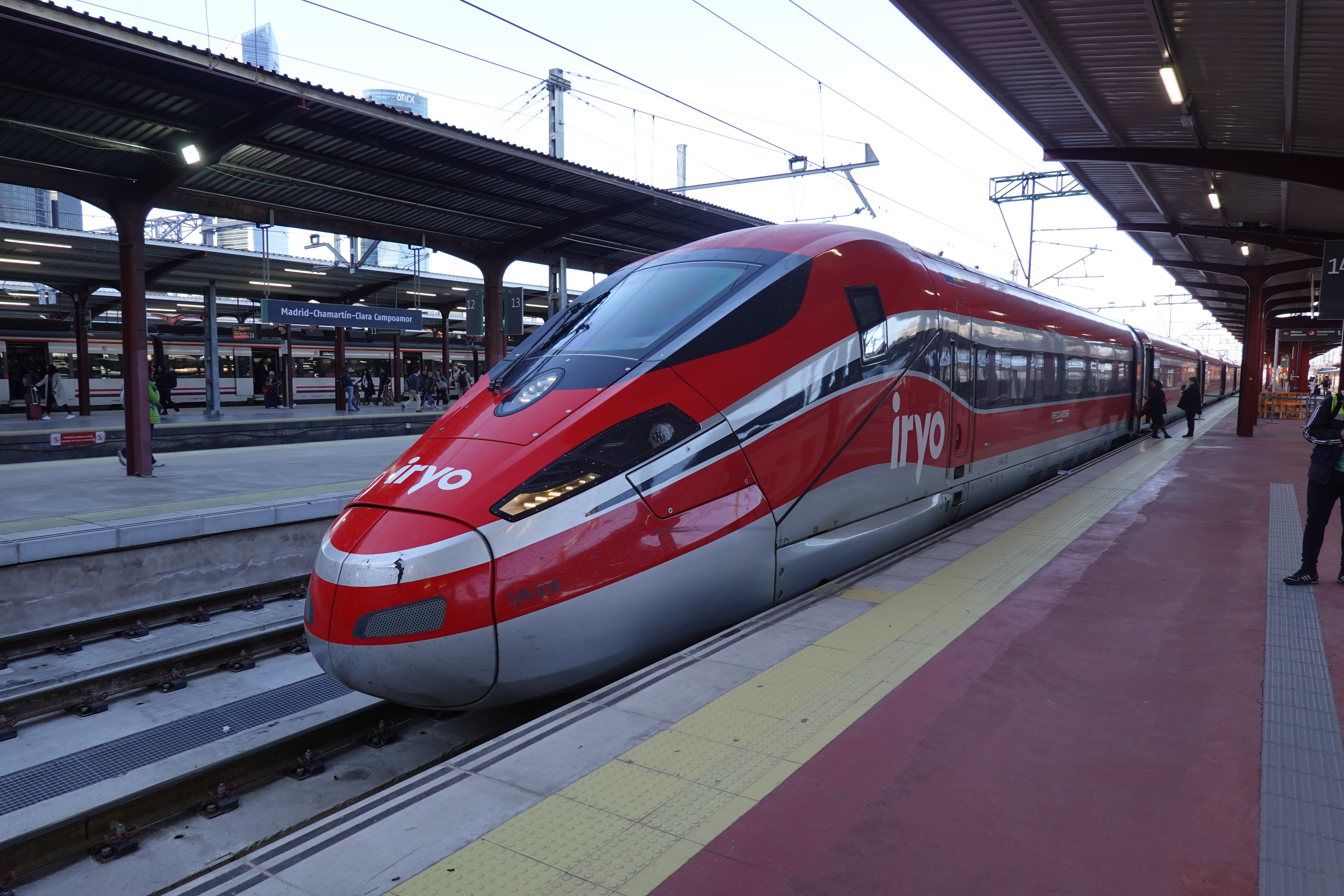
A Frecciarossa 1000 (Iryo class 109) at Madrid Chamartín station.

== Lines in operation ==
Currently there are five corridors with twelve main lines in operation, as well as two spur lines connecting the cities of Toledo with the Madrid–Seville main line and Huesca with the Madrid–Barcelona main line. Two more lines, one along the Mediterranean Corridor and one towards Extremadura are partially in operation for Alvia/Euromed services, since they are still under construction.

Line	Connected cities/stations	Year of inauguration	Operational top speed	Type of trains
North-western corridor
HSR Madrid – Galicia	Ourense · Santiago de Compostela	2011	300 km/h or 186 mph	S-106, S-121, S-130, S-730
HSR Madrid – Galicia	Madrid Chamartín · Segovia · Olmedo · Zamora	2015	300 km/h or 186 mph	S-102, S-106, S-130, S-730
HSR Madrid – Galicia	Zamora · Sanabria	2020	300 km/h or 186 mph	S-102, S-106, S-130, S-730
HSR Madrid – Galicia	Sanabria · Ourense	2021	300 km/h or 186 mph	S-102, S-106, S-130, S-730
HSR Atlantic Axis	Santiago de Compostela · A Coruña	2011	250 km/h or 124 mph	S-106, S-121, S-130, S-730
HSR Atlantic Axis	Vigo · Pontevedra · Santiago de Compostela	20 April 2015	250 km/h or 124 mph	S-106, S-121, S-130, S-730
North corridor
HSR Madrid – Asturias	Madrid Chamartín · Segovia · Valladolid	2007	300 km/h or 186 mph	S-102, S-106, S-112, S-114, S-130, S-121, TGV Duplex
HSR Madrid – Asturias	Valladolid · Venta de Baños · Palencia · León	2015	300 km/h or 186 mph	S-102, S-106, S-112, S-114, S-130, S-121
HSR Madrid – Asturias	León · La Robla · Pola de Lena	2023	300 km/h or 186 mph	S-106, S-130, S-121
HSR Madrid – Burgos	Madrid Chamartín · Segovia · Valladolid · Venta de Baños	2015	300 km/h or 186 mph	S-112, S-114
HSR Madrid – Burgos	Venta de Baños · Burgos	2022	300 km/h or 186 mph	S-112, S-114
North-eastern corridor
HSR Madrid – Barcelona	Madrid Atocha · Guadalajara–Yebes · Calatayud · Zaragoza · Lleida	2003	300 km/h or 186 mph (310 km/h or 193 mph between 2011 and 2016 on Guadalajara-Calatayud).	S-100, S-103, S-106, S-112, S-120, S-121, TGV Duplex, Frecciarossa 1000
HSR Madrid – Barcelona	Lleida · Camp de Tarragona	2006	300 km/h or 186 mph (310 km/h or 193 mph between 2011 and 2016 on Guadalajara-Calatayud).	S-100, S-103, S-106, S-112, S-120, S-121, TGV Duplex, Frecciarossa 1000
HSR Madrid – Barcelona	Camp de Tarragona · Barcelona-Sants	2008	300 km/h or 186 mph (310 km/h or 193 mph between 2011 and 2016 on Guadalajara-Calatayud).	S-100, S-103, S-106, S-112, S-120, S-121, S-130, TGV Duplex, Frecciarossa 1000
HSR Barcelona – Perpignan	Figueres · Perpignan (France)	2009	300 km/h or 186 mph	SNCF TGV Duplex
HSR Barcelona – Perpignan	Barcelona-Sants · Barcelona-Sagrera · Girona · Figueres	2013	300 km/h or 186 mph	S-100, S-112, S-130, SNCF TGV Duplex
HSR Madrid – Huesca	Madrid Atocha · Guadalajara–Yebes · Calatayud · Zaragoza · Tardienta · Huesca	2005	300 km/h or 186 mph	S-102, S-112
Eastern corridor
HSR Madrid – Castellón	Madrid Atocha · Cuenca · Requena-Utiel · Valencia	2010	300 km/h or 186 mph	S-102, S-106, S-112, TGV Duplex, Frecciarossa 1000
HSR Madrid – Castellón	Valencia · Castellón	2018	300 km/h or 186 mph	S-112, S-130
HSR Madrid – Alicante	Madrid Chamartín · Cuenca · Albacete	2010	300 km/h or 186 mph	S-106, S-112, S-130, TGV Duplex, Frecciarossa 1000
HSR Madrid – Alicante	Albacete · Villena · Alicante	2013	300 km/h or 186 mph	S-106, S-112, S-130, TGV Duplex, Frecciarossa 1000
HSR Madrid – Murcia	Madrid Atocha · Cuenca · Albacete · Elche · Orihuela	2021	300 km/h or 186 mph	S-106, S-112
HSR Madrid – Murcia	Orihuela · Murcia	2022	300 km/h or 186 mph	S-106, S-112
Southern corridor
HSR Madrid – Seville	Madrid Atocha · Ciudad Real · Puertollano · Córdoba · Seville	14 April 1992	300 km/h or 186 mph	S-100, S-102, S-103, S-112, S-104, Frecciarossa 1000
HSR Madrid – Seville	Seville · Jerez de la Frontera · Cádiz	2015	200 km/h or 124 mph	S-130
HSR Madrid – Málaga	Madrid Atocha · Ciudad Real · Puertollano · Córdoba · Puente Genil-Herrera · Antequera · Málaga	2007	300 km/h or 186 mph	S-102, S-103, S-112, S-104, Frecciarossa 1000, S-730
HSR Madrid – Toledo	Madrid Atocha · Toledo	2005	250 km/h or 155 mph	S-104
HSR Antequera–Granada	Antequera · Granada	2019	300 km/h or 186 mph	S-102, S-112, S-730
South-western corridor
HSR Madrid–Extremadura	Plasencia · Badajoz	2022	200 km/h or 124 mph	S-730
Mediterranean corridor
HSR Catalonia–Andalusia	Tarragona · Vandellós	2020	200 km/h or 124 mph	S-121, S-130

=== North-western corridor ===
Map of the high-speed rail network (newly built and upgraded lines) with the year of opening. Also shows under construction, planned or in study lines.

==== Madrid–Galicia ====
The Madrid–Galicia high-speed rail line connects the city of Madrid with the region of Galicia and the Atlantic Axis high-speed rail line in the North West of Spain via Segovia, Zamora, Puebla de Sanabria, Ourense and Santiago de Compostela. The line includes a new 424 km long high-speed railway section that starts at Olmedo 130 km to the north of Madrid on the Madrid–Leon high-speed rail line and ends at Santiago de Compostela. It was put in AVE service on 21 December 2021.

AVE trains run on the routes Madrid–Ourense, Madrid–A Coruña and Madrid–Vigo with a maximum operating speed of 300 km/h and cover the distances in 2h 15min, 3h 33min and 4h 18min respectively. There is also an AVE schedule between Alicante and Ourense via Madrid Chamartín that covers the distance in 4h 56min, whilst Alvia services on the line on class 130 and 730 gauge-changing trains with a commercial speed of 250 km/h, connect Madrid to Vigo, Lugo and Ferrol and Barcelona to A Coruña and Vigo. Since 5 November 2024, two Alvia Madrid-Vigo services bypassing Santiago de Compostela are replaced by AVE services on Talgo AVRIL trains, thus achieving for first time journey times between Madrid and Vigo below 4 hours at 3h 57min.

Part of the line up to Medina del Campo is also used for the Alvia Madrid–Salamanca and Barcelona–Salamanca services.

==== The Atlantic Axis ====
The Atlantic Axis high-speed railway line is connecting the two main cities of Vigo and A Coruña (Corunna) via Santiago de Compostela in the northwestern Spanish region of Galicia. The railway, 155.6 km in length, is an upgrade of the former non electrified single railway line between the town of Ferrol and the Portuguese border for the part between A Coruña and Vigo, into a double electrified high-speed line. The new rebuilt railway permits mixed use traffic with a maximum design speed of 250 km/h for passenger trains. The line is connected at Santiago de Compostela with the Madrid–Galicia high-speed rail line.

The line is partially served by S-121 (max speed 250 km/h (155 mph)) trainsets for the medium distance Avant services on the route A Coruña–Ourense via Santiago de Compostela. AVE and Avlo services are also using parts of the line connecting A Coruña and Vigo to Madrid on S-106 trains (max speed 330 km/h or 205 mph) while Alvia S-730 (Patito, max speed 250 km/h (155 mph)) trainsets are also connecting Galicia with other Spanish regions.

=== North corridor ===
==== Madrid–Asturias ====
The Madrid–Asturias high-speed rail line connects Madrid with the autonomous community of Asturias. The line first connects the cities of Segovia and Valladolid until it branches off the Valladolid–Vitoria high-speed section at Venta de Baños: 205 km north of Madrid and then reaches Asturias at Pola de Lena via Palencia and León. The line supports the longest railway tunnel in Spain at 28 km in length and is served on the Madrid–León route by up to two AVE S-102 (Pato, max speed 330 km/h or 205 mph) trains per day with the fastest schedule lasting 2 hours and 6 minutes, one AVE S-106 (max speed 330 km/h or 205 mph) Madrid–Gijón train per day that covers the distance in 3 hours and 36 minutes and one AVE S-106 Castellón/Vinaros–Gijón train per day. There are also a direct León–Valencia and León–Alicante AVE schedules on S-112 trains.

Other trainsets used on the Madrid–Asturias line include S-120 (max speed 250 km/h (155 mph)) and S-130 (Patito, max speed 250 km/h (155 mph)) for the Alvia services, that run the Madrid–Avilés and Alicante–Gijón routes, making additional stops in Pola de Lena, Mieres and Oviedo in Asturias. Medium distance Avant services connect Madrid to Valladolid via Segovia station.

==== Madrid–Burgos ====
The Madrid–Burgos high-speed rail line connects Madrid with Burgos. The line shares a common section with the Madrid–Asturias high-speed rail line up to Venta de Baños and then includes an 86.5 km long spur line up to the city of Burgos. S-112 trains are used for the AVE Madrid–Burgos service and cover the distance in 1 hour and 33 minutes by making one stop in the city of Valladolid. Since January 2023 the AVE service between Burgos and Valencia connects the two cities in 3 hour and 30 minutes and since April 2024 the AVE service Burgos–Murcia links the two cities.

=== North-eastern corridor ===
==== Madrid–Barcelona ====
Madrid–Barcelona high-speed railway line connects Madrid with Barcelona in the north east of Spain passing through the cities of Guadalajara, Calatayud, Zaragoza (Saragossa), Lleida (Lérida) and Tarragona where the future Tarragona–Valencia high-speed railway line will connect. The line has a length of 621 km and a travel time of two and a half hours for the direct trains using the route avoiding entering Zaragoza (Saragossa) and Lleida (Lérida). The line is served by AVE S-103 (max speed 350 km/h or 217 mph) and Avlo S-106 (max speed 380 km/h or 236 mph) trains between the two cities. Twenty six AVE and Avlo trains run every day per direction between 6:00 and 21:10 hrs, six of them continue to Figueres. In addition there is one international AVE train per day with destination to Marseille. Direct AVE trains Barcelona–Seville and Barcelona–Málaga that do not make a stop in Madrid are also scheduled combining the Madrid–Barcelona line with one of the southern corridor's existing lines. S-112 (Pato, max speed 330 km/h or 205 mph) trains are used for these services and cover these distances in less than 6 hours. The same S-112 trains are used for the low cost Avlo Madrid–Zaragoza–Barcelona–Figueres service on the line. Iryo and Ouigo España offer five additional Madrid–Barcelona schedules per day per direction each, with some schedules calling at Zaragoza–Delicias and Camp de Tarragona stations. Medium distance Avant Barcelona–Lleida and Calatayud–Zaragoza services are also scheduled on the line. Alvia services are using parts of the Madrid–Barcelona line connecting Madrid with Pamplona and Logroño via Calatayud and Barcelona with Bilbao, San Sebastián, Salamanca, Vigo and A Coruña via Zaragoza.

==== Barcelona–Perpignan (France) ====
The international high-speed section across the border, Perpignan–Figueres (44.4 km), of the Perpignan–Barcelona high-speed rail line opened in December 2010. Since then, French TGV trains operate from Paris. The Spanish high-speed section Barcelona–Figueres opened on 7 January 2013. Nine Spanish services initially serviced the line, with 8 being a through service to Madrid, which also connected with two French TGV services from Paris. Previously French TGV services connected Paris and Barcelona by means of a shuttle train on the standard Barcelona–Figueres line. Direct Barcelona–Paris, Madrid–Marseille, Barcelona–Lyon and Barcelona–Toulouse high-speed trains between France and Spain started on 15 December 2013. However, after braking up the Renfe-SNCF cooperation in 2022, SNCF relaunched the Barcelona–Paris TGV service on its own under the TGV inOui brand, and later in summer 2023 Renfe introduced its own new services under the AVE brand on the routes Madrid–Marseille and Barcelona–Lyon. Medium distance Avant Barcelona–Girona and Barcelona–Figueres services are also scheduled on the line.

==== Madrid–Huesca ====
The Zaragoza–Huesca section branches off from the Madrid–Barcelona line at Zaragoza and connects with the city of Huesca and serves the connection train station for regional trains in the town of Tardienta. The line first put in operation in 2005 and is served by up to two AVE S-102 (Pato, max speed 330 km/h or 205 mph) trains per day with the fastest train journey between the two cities lasting 2 hours and 5 minutes. The line is also used by the Huesca–Seville AVE service on S-100 (max speed 300 km/h or 186 mph) trains that cover the distance in 5 hours 38 minutes while calling at Tardienta, Zaragoza, Calatayud, Guadalajara, Madrid-Puerta de Atocha and Córdoba.

=== Eastern corridor ===
==== Madrid–Castellón ====
The Madrid–Castellón line connects the city of Castellón with the city of Madrid passing through the cities of Cuenca, Requena-Utiel and Valencia. The section It is serviced by AVE S-112 (Pato, max speed 330 km/h or 205 mph) trains, assembled by the Talgo-Bombardier consortium. Direct AVE trains to Valencia cover the 391 km in 98 minutes while thirty trains run every day between 05:00 and 21:00, fifteen in each direction. For the service Madrid–Castellón AVE trains cover the distance in 2 hours and 25 minutes and 4 trains per day are scheduled, two in each direction. The line is part of the Madrid–Levante network.

Direct AVE trains Valencia–Seville that do not make a stop in Madrid are also scheduled combining the existing lines of Madrid–Castellón and Madrid–Seville. S-102 (Pato, max speed 330 km/h or 205 mph) trains are used for this service and cover the whole distance in 3 hours and 50 minutes. In addition AVE Valencia–Burgos and Valencia–León services via Madrid Chamartín are offered in the line. The line is partially used by the Iryo Madrid–Valencia service calling at Cuenca–Fernando Zóbel station, by the low cost Avlo Madrid–Valencia service, by the Ouigo España Madrid–Valencia service and by the Avant Valencia–Requena-Utiel service. The line is also used by the Alvia Gijón–Castellón and Gijón–Vinaros services via Madrid Chamartín.

==== Madrid–Alicante ====
A 350 km/h line branches off from the Madrid–Castellón Line and connects the city of Alicante with the city of Madrid passing through the cities of Cuenca, Albacete and Villena. It is part of the Madrid–Levante HSR network and is serviced by AVE S-112 (Pato, max speed 330 km/h or 205 mph) trains that cover the distance in up to 2 hours and 12 minutes. It is also used by the low cost Avlo, the Ouigo España and the Iryo Madrid–Alicante services calling at Albacete-Los Llanos station and the Avlo Valladolid–Alicante service. In addition there are direct Alicante–Ourense and Alicante–Leon via Madrid Chamartín and Alicante–Málaga via Madrid Atocha AVE services as well as an Alicante–Valladolid Ouigo España service via Madrid Chamartín that are using the line. Avant trains in the Toledo–Albacete route via Madrid Atocha are also scheduled in the line. The line is also used by the Alvia Gijón–Alicante and Santander–Alicante services via Madrid Chamartín.

==== Madrid–Murcia ====
Branching out from the Madrid–Alicante Line at Monforte del Cid to extend the network towards Murcia, this branch links Albacete, Elche, Orihuela and Murcia. The first AVE service to Orihuela was inaugurated on 1 February 2021 while the extension to Murica was inaugurated on 20 December 2022. Work is being prepared to extend the line to Cartagena. The AVE Madrid–Elche–Orihuela–Murcia daily service takes 2 hours and 45 minutes for the fastest journey served by S-112 (Pato, max speed 330 km/h or 205 mph) trains running at maximum speed of 300 km/h. Some trains are arriving to Alicante and then reversing towards Murcia. The Ouigo España Madrid–Albacete–Elche–Murcia daily service also takes 2 hours and 45 minutes. There is also a Murcia–Burgos AVE service, a one way Murcia–Valladolid Avlo service via Madrid Chamartín and a Murcia–Málaga AVE service via Alicante and Madrid-Puerta de Atocha on the line. Finally medium distance Avant services connect Murcia to Alicante making intermediate stops in Beniel, Orihuela, Callosa Cox and Elche.

=== South corridor ===
==== Madrid–Seville ====
The Madrid–Seville high-speed railway line connects Madrid with Seville in the south of Spain, passing through the cities of Ciudad Real, Puertollano and Córdoba, where the Madrid–Málaga high-speed rail line branches off towards Málaga just outside Los Mochos near Almodóvar del Río. The route travels across the plains of Castile, travelling through the Sierra Morena mountains just before reaching Córdoba, before going onward towards Seville through the largely flat land surrounding the Guadalquivir river. The Madrid–Seville line was the first dedicated passenger high-speed rail line to be built in Spain and was completed in time for Seville's Expo 92.

With a length of 472 km, the fastest train journey between the two cities takes 2 hours and 20 minutes. The line is served by AVE S-100 (max speed 300 km/h or 186 mph) trains for the Madrid–Seville and the Seville–Huesca services, whilst AVE S-112 (Pato, max speed 330 km/h (205 mph)) trains are used on the routes Seville–Valencia and Seville–Barcelona. The line is also used by the Iryo Madrid–Seville service calling at Córdoba station and by the low cost Avlo high speed service (2 trains per day) on 438 seat S-112 trains calling at all intermediate stations. Medium distance Avant services connect Madrid to Puertollano via Ciudad Real station and Seville to Málaga and to Granada via Córdoba station. The extension section of the Madrid-Seville high-speed rail line to Cádiz is built in Iberian gauge and is served by Alvia trains that connect the city of Cádiz to Madrid and reach speeds up to 200 km/h in this section. The Alvia Madrid–Huelva service is also running along the line.

==== Madrid–Málaga ====
The Madrid–Málaga high-speed rail line connects the city of Málaga with the city of Madrid. The line shares a common section with the Madrid–Seville high-speed rail line up to the city of Córdoba and then includes a 155 km long spur line up to the city of Málaga. It is served by AVE S-103 trains and the fastest train journey between the two cities takes 2 hours and 20 minutes. There is also a direct Málaga–Barcelona AVE service on S-103 trains and a direct Málaga–Murcia via Madrid-Puerta de Atocha and Alicante AVE service on AVE S-112 trains, while the line is also used by the Iryo Madrid–Málaga service calling at Córdoba station and by the low cost Avlo high speed service (2 trains per day) on 438 seat S-112 trains calling at all intermediate stations. Medium distance Avant services connect Málaga to Seville via Córdoba, Puente Genil-Herrera and Antequera-Santa Ana stations and to Granada via Antequera-Santa Ana. Apart from the traffic to and from the city of Málaga, the line also handles the traffic to the cities of Granada and Algeciras. In the future, the line will also support the traffic between Madrid and the Costa del Sol high-speed rail line.

==== Madrid–Toledo ====
The Madrid–Toledo high-speed rail line branches off from the Seville and Málaga routes around the depot at La Sagra. The Avant service between the two cities offers journey times of half an hour on trains with a maximum speed of 250 km/h.

==== Madrid–Granada ====
The 122.8 km Antequera–Granada high-speed rail line is a part of the under construction Andalusian Transverse Axis high-speed rail line. The three times per day AVE service between Madrid Atocha and Granada covers the distance of 568 km in 3 h 5 min. The daily AVE train between Granada and Barcelona Sants connects the two cities in 6 h 25 min. S-102 and S-112 (Pato, max speed 330 km/h or 205 mph) trains are used for these services and all trains call at Córdoba, offering a journey time of 90 min from Granada. Medium distance Avant services connect Granada to Málaga and to Seville calling at Loja and Antequera-Santa Ana. The line is also used by the daily Alvia service Madrid-Almeria on S-730 trains.

=== Mediterranean corridor ===
Only some sections along the Spanish Mediterranean Sea coast have high-speed railway standards. Such sections include the recently new built 46,5 km Camp de Tarragona-Vandellòs section and the 72 km Valencia-Castellón and the most recent Monforte del Cid-Murcia sections as parts of the Madrid–Levante network. The section between Camp de Tarragona and Figueres is a part of the Madrid–Barcelona-Figueres high-speed line while the section between Vandellòs and Castellón is an upgraded line of the old Iberian-gauge Valencia–Sant Vicenç de Calders railway. Sections linking Valencia with Alicante are currently under construction to be converted to standard gauge high-speed standards. Renfe's Euromed service operate along the Mediterranean coast between Figueres and Alicante at speeds up to 250 km/h for the high-speed parts by using dual-gauge RENFE Class 130 trainsets. Euromed offers Barcelona-Valencia connection in 2 hours and 35 minutes and Barcelona-Alicante in 4 hours and 20 minutes while some services are extended to Girona and Figueres. In addition the medium distance Avant Barcelona–Figueres, Barcelona–Tortosa and Murcia–Alicante services also operate along the Mediterranean corridor.

=== Madrid interconnector ===
A new interconnecting tunnel between Madrid Atocha and Madrid Chamartín stations opened to service in July 2022. The following services are using the tunnel: AVE Madrid–Alicante service having Madrid Chamartín station as a terminal station, the AVE Burgos–Valencia, Burgos–Murcia, Alicante–Ourense and Alicante–Leon services, the Avlo Murcia–Valladolid and Valladolid–Alicante services, and the Alicante–Valladolid Ouigo España service. Also passing through this tunnel are the Alvia trains for services connecting Gijón to Alicante, Santander to Alicante and Gijón to Oropesa Del Mar via Valencia. The Madrid–Badajoz Alvia service uses this tunnel too, starting at Madrid Chamartín and making a stop at the Cercanías part of Madrid Atocha.

== Lines under construction ==
Currently there are six corridors with eleven lines under construction.

Map of the planned high-speed rail network (newly built and upgraded lines).

=== North corridor ===
==== Pola de Lena–Gijón ====
- Pola de Lena–Oviedo–Gijón

The northmost section of the Madrid–Asturias high-speed railway within the region of Asturias between Pola de Lena and Gijón is planned to be renovated by 2024. It has a total length of 62 km.

==== Burgos–Vitoria ====
- Burgos–Miranda de Ebro–Vitoria-Gasteiz

The extension of the Madrid–Valladolid section towards the Basque Country began construction in 2009. This 223.4 kilometres (138.8 mi) railway line will run parallel to the 244.8 kilometres (152.1 mi) long existing railway line. Originally it was to be used as a mixed-use high-speed railway line, but it has since been changed to a passenger-dedicated railway line, leaving the existing railway line for freight trains. The line was forecast to open the Valladolid–Burgos part around 2013 and the Burgos–Vitoria-Gasteiz part in 2014 or 2015. However, due to delays the line is not expected to open before 2028, although the Valladolid–Burgos section entered full revenue service in July 2022. At Vitoria it will be connected to the Basque high-speed railway line (Basque Y), thus reaching the French border. Once opened, the travel time between Valladolid and Vitoria will be around an hour.

==== Basque Y ====
- Bilbao–Vitoria-Gasteiz–San Sebastián–French border

The Basque high-speed railway line (Basque Y) will connect the three Basque capitals, Vitoria-Gasteiz, Bilbao and San Sebastián. Construction began in October 2006 and the line was originally forecast to open in 2016. However, due to delays in construction, later estimations forecast its completion in 2023 but Adif's draft budget in end 2022 put again the completion of the Basque Y further to the year 2027. The three Basque capitals will be further connected with Madrid via Valladolid, and with the French border via Irun and Bayonne while a connection with Pamplona via two different alternative routes is currently in debate.

==== Madrid-Santander ====
- Madrid–Segovia–Valladolid–Palencia–Reinosa–Santander

A new high-speed line is planned to branch off from the current Madrid–Leon high-speed rail line at Palencia and as a part of the north corridor will connect the region of Cantabria to the high-speed rail network with direct connection to Madrid. According to the plans the city of Santander will be connected via Villaprovedo and Reinosa. An agreement for completing the line by the end of 2015 was signed on 11 August 2010 including the agreement to call tenders for the section between Palencia and Villaprovedo before the end of March 2011 and for the Villaprovedo – Reinosa section before the end of 2012. However, construction works in the line started in November 2021 for the 20,8 km section between Palencia Norte and Osorno, while the section between Osorno and Reinosa was planned to be projected in 2022 and to start construction in 2023. In October 2022, construction approval was given by the Spanish government for the 20,7 km section between Osorno and Calahorra de Boedo, while tendering for the 13,7 km section between Calahorra de Boedo and Alar del Rey started in December 2022. As of 2023 a total 78,4 km of the line in the part between Palencia and Alar del Rey are projected.

=== Eastern corridor ===
==== Alicante–Cartagena ====
- Alicante–Murcia–Cartagena

This is an under construction section, part of the Madrid–Levante network of high-speed railways connecting the capital with the Mediterranean coast. Consisting of 955 kilometres (593 mi) of railways with an estimated cost of 12.5 billion euros, it is the most expensive high-speed railway project in Spain. The network will consist of both dedicated passenger high-speed railways designed for trains running above 300 kilometres per hour (190 mph) and high-speed railways shared with freight trains. The network is to be opened in stages, starting with the Madrid–Valencia/Albacete section, which was opened in December 2010, followed by Albacete–Alicante in June 2013, Valencia–Castellón in January 2018, Monforte del Cid–Orihuela in February 2021 and reached the city of Murcia in December 2022, while a branch line to Cartagena is expected to follow by 2024. The section linking Valencia with Alicante in the Mediterranean Corridor was originally expected to open in 2022 but as of 2025 this was delayed to 2027.

=== South corridor ===
==== Seville–Antequera ====
- Transversal Rail Axis (Eje Ferroviario transversal de Andalucía), the Andalusian high-speed rail line connecting Huelva, Seville, Granada and Almería. Part of the line is financed and built by the Andalusian government.

The southern Andalusian transverse high-speed railway line is a 503.7-kilometre railway running between the cities of Huelva and Almería, passing the cities of Seville and Granada. The line is designed for speeds up to 250 kilometres per hour, except for the 130-kilometre Antequera–Granada and the 103-kilometre Seville–Huelva parts of the line, which are designed for speeds in excess of 300 kilometres per hour. A connection between Huelva and the Portuguese border is being studied. When finished the journey between Huelva and Almería in the new line is estimated to last 3 hours and 35 minutes.

The first section Antequera–Granada was put in service on 26 June 2019 connecting the city of Granada to the rest of the high speed network via a branch from the Madrid–Málaga high-speed rail line. In March 2024 the contract to build the last remaining high-speed section of this line, bypassing Loja, was awarded.

Construction in the 128 km section between Seville and Antequera started in 2005 under the responsibility of the Regional Government of Andalusia on a route that includes Seville–Santa Justa, Seville Airport, Los Alcores Tunnel, Marchena, Osuna, Pedrera and Antequera-Santa Ana. However, since 2013 construction works are halted due to lack of funding with platform works in the 75 km section between Marchena and Antequera to be completed at a cost of 288 million euros, but with the remaining part between Sevilla-Santa Justa and Marchena to remain incomplete. As of 2023 the Government of Andalusia is planning to start studies in order to find new financing possibilities and continue the project. Works in the section between Granada and Almería have not started yet and completion is forecast no earlier than 2030.

==== Madrid–Jaén ====
- Madrid–Montoro bypass–Jaén

As of 2026, the planned high-speed connection between Madrid and Jaén is a bypass from the Madrid–Seville high-speed rail line to the existing conventional Córdoba–Jaén line, including a new gauge changer.Trains to Jaén would no longer need to enter Córdoba station, and passengers would no longer need to change trains there. The bypass is expected to cut the Madrid–Jaén journey time by more than 50 minutes, to about three hours.

The feasibility study analysed five alternatives and found the project socio-economically viable. In March 2025 the Ministry of Transport selected alternative B, because it gives the largest reduction in journey time. This alternative is a single-track bypass of about 19 km, including connecting spurs, passing Pedro Abad and Adamuz near Montoro. It connects directly to the high-speed line for trains towards Madrid, and through a grade-separated junction for trains towards Jaén.

The bypass supersedes the earlier plan for a high-speed line via Alcázar de San Juan. That line would have used the first 99 km of the Madrid–Seville line, followed by a new 67.5 km branch to Alcázar de San Juan. From Alcázar, the existing line would have been upgraded for passenger trains at up to 250 km/h. It would also have received a new double-track route through the Despeñaperros pass, replacing the existing single-track route.

Construction was approved on 15 July 2005, but work stopped for years and only resumed in November 2017. The only section completed was Grañena–Jaén (16.7 km), in March 2020. This section can be used for the new alternative B as well.

=== Mediterranean corridor ===
==== Tarragona–Almería ====
- Tarragona–Valencian Community–Murcia Region–Almería

The railway linking Tarragona to Almería via Valencia and Murcia is expected to be completed after 2026 when the currently under construction 184 km Murcia–Almería high-speed rail line will be finished.

Its first 46.5 km new built cut-off part in Iberian-gauge track between Camp de Tarragona and Vandellòs started commercial services on 13 January 2020 and it is designed for speeds up to 200 km/h. A new dual-gauge high speed rail track on the 72 km part between Valencia and Castellón was inaugurated in January 2018. The section between Vandellòs and Castellón is an upgraded line of the old Iberian-gauge Valencia–Sant Vicenç de Calders railway currently used by the Euromed service in speeds up to 220 km/h that covers distance of 400 km between the cities of Barcelona and Valencia in 2 hours and 35 minutes. With a new line, it will take about 1 hour and 45 minutes on high speed trains to cover the same distance. However, this part is not under construction yet for a new standard-gauge high speed line.

The section linking Valencia with Alicante is expected to be completed by 2027. The 52 km part between Torrent outside Valencia and Xàtiva, which has still been under construction since October 2002, was initially expected to be completed by the end of 2020, and it is designed for speeds up to 350 km/h. Electrification works on the line were completed in December 2016. Modernization works for the 40 km single track in the remaining part between Xàtiva and La Encina Hub including conversion to standard-gauge high speed line for maximum speed of 260 km/h were expected to be completed by end 2022, but as of early 2023 they were still in testing phase. Since 9 September 2023 this section has been closed to traffic in order for additional works to take place to add a double track.

The final section between Almería and Algeciras, passing through Málaga, will be built at a later point in time, and an alternative and longer route looks likely.

=== South-western corridor ===
==== Madrid–Extremadura ====
- Madrid–Toledo–Talavera de la Reina–Plasencia–Cáceres–Mérida–Badajoz

This line was initially planned as Lisbon–Madrid high-speed rail line in order to connect the two peninsular capitals, Madrid and Lisbon in 2 hours and 45 minutes. This line had been a key issue in bilateral summits in recent years and was about to link Spain's high-speed rail network with the planned High-speed rail in Portugal, a project announced by the Portuguese government in February 2009. Construction on the Spanish side began in late 2008 on a segment between the cities of Badajoz and Mérida. Both Spanish and Portuguese track were to be completed around 2013; later the Portuguese government brought forward its plans from 2015, but the Portuguese froze works in June 2011 and eventually cancelled the project in March 2012. In 2016 the European Union's European Regional Development Fund gave Spain €205.1m towards the €312.1m needed for the track between Navalmoral de la Mata and Mérida, Spain. The section on the Spanish side between Madrid and Badajoz was originally expected to be completed by 2023. However, according to new estimations the line is not expected to be completed before 2030.

With a length of 439 km on the Spanish side, of which 48 km are part of the already built Madrid–Seville high-speed rail line, the original plan was to connect cities like Talavera de la Reina, Navalmoral de la Mata, Plasencia, Cáceres, Mérida and Badajoz to Madrid. The Almonte River Viaduct was completed in May 2016 to carry this line. It is a concrete arch bridge with a span of 384 meters (1,260 feet), ranking among the longest in the world of this type of bridge. For the section between Madrid and Oropesa a new Informative Study was awarded by the Ministry of Public Works in February 2018 in order to propose alternative routes with lower environmental impact than those in the initial study from 2008. In November 2020 the new study was approved by the Ministry of Transport and in the revised proposal the city of Toledo was added in the route by the use of the existing high speed section between Madrid and Toledo. The new introduced 127 km section with a budget of €1.3 billion starts from Toledo and passes through the cities of Talavera de la Reina and Oropesa until it reaches the border of the Province of Toledo with new stations planned in all those three cities.

The section between Plasencia and Mérida was originally planned to go into service by the end of 2021. However, the first part put in service was the entire 150 km section between Plasencia and Badajoz that was inaugurated on 18 July 2022 at an investment cost of €1.7 billion. It is a double Iberian gauge line that is due to be changed to standard gauge in the future. The total budget for the Madrid–Extremadura line is €3.7 billion, and when the line is finished it is expected to provide high-speed rail services linking Badajoz to Madrid in 2 hours 31 minutes.

=== Two Seas corridor ===
==== Zaragoza–Pamplona ====
- Zaragoza–Castejon–Pamplona

A high-speed track between Zaragoza (Aragon) and Pamplona (Navarre) is currently under development as a part of the Two Seas (Cantabrian-Mediterranean) corridor. The section between Castejon and Pamplona (both in Navarre) with a total length of 75.5 kilometres is under construction with some sub-sections already completed. The line initially expected to be completed by 2023 but new estimations give 2027 as the completion year. The 82.3 km section between Zaragoza and Castejón is in the design phase with the second informative study publicised in 2023, while its completion is expected to take at least one more decade. The total budget for the Zaragoza–Pamplona line ranges from 1,252 to 1,446 million euros, depending on the layout around Zaragoza and the planned station in Tudela, while travel time is expected to be cut in half from two hours now to one hour on the new high-speed line.

== Lines planned ==
In the short term, other connections to the LGV are planned. After the connection to France at La Jonquera in Catalonia, another connection is proposed at Irun in the Basque Country. Other new lines are under consideration, including a line connecting Soria to the Madrid–Barcelona line at Calatayud. Finally, the Madrid–Barcelona line currently terminates in Barcelona's Estació de Sants, but a new station is under construction at La Sagrera on the northern edge of the city.

In the long term, the Spanish government has an ambitious plan to make 7,000 kilometres (4,300 mi) of high-speed railway operational, with all provincial capitals at most only 4 hours from Madrid, and 6 1/2 hours from Barcelona. According to the Strategic Plan for railway infrastructures developed by the Spanish Ministerio de Fomento (Ministry of Public Works), called PEIT, and published in 2005, a second expansion program is planned to start when the last lines of the first program begin operation. This plan initially had a ten-year scope, ending in 2020, and its ambition was to increase the 300 km/h (186 mph) network to 10,000 kilometres (6,200 mi) by the end of that year. However, this program has been postponed indefinitely, since the first expansion program is still ongoing. When both programs are completed, the Spanish high-speed network will be the most extensive network in Europe, with several operational links with France and Portugal, and this is the most ambitious high-speed rail plan in the European Union.

=== Connection with Barajas Airport ===
In May 2021 the Spanish Ministry of Transport, Mobility and Urban Agenda announced its plans to connect Madrid's Adolfo Suárez Madrid–Barajas Airport with the high-speed network. According to these plans, this will be realised in two phases. In the first short-term phase, AVE trains will reach the airport by sharing a line with the Cercanías trains until Chamartín station. Tendering for these works was planned to start in 2022. In the long term, during the second phase, a dedicated high-speed line will be constructed to connect the airport.

=== Cantabrian Sea corridor ===
- Galicia–Asturias–Cantabria–Basque Country–French border

The 430 km high-speed line will connect Ferrol in Galicia with Bilbao in the Basque Country passing through the regions of Asturias and Cantabria along the Cantabrian Sea coast in the north Spain. The line will be further connected to the Atlantic Axis high-speed rail line on the west, the Basque Y high-speed railway line on the east and the north corridor (Madrid–Asturias high-speed rail line) in the Asturias region. The travel time between El Ferrol and Bilbao in the new line is estimated to last 1 hour and 48 minutes at average speeds of 250 km/h (155 mph). The line is not yet projected, although the initial plan was for completion before 2024.

=== Two seas corridor ===
- Valencian Community–Aragon–La Rioja–Navarre–Basque Country–French border

The line will connect the Valencian Community with the Basque Country region and the French border passing through the regions of Aragon, Navarre and La Rioja, with further connection to the TGV network via Irun towards Bordeaux and Paris. The line will include two connections between the region of Aragon and the Basque Country, one via Pamplona in Navarre towards the French border and one via Logroño in La Rioja towards Bilbao. Connected cities will include Valencia, Teruel, Zaragoza, Pamplona, Logroño, Vitoria-Gasteiz, San Sebastián and Bilbao with possible further connection to Santander. The travel time between Valencia and Bilbao in the new high-speed line will be decreased from 9 hours down to roughly 4 hours. Some sections between the regions of Aragon, Navarre and La Rioja are projected, while the section between Castejon and Pamplona is currently under construction. The Ministry of Development has not set a target date to complete the Cantabrian-Mediterranean corridor yet.

=== Central-Pyrenees corridor ===
- Zaragoza–Huesca–French border–Toulouse

A new high-capacity rail connecting Spain with France on international standard gauge track is considered via a 40 km tunnel through the central Pyrenees mountains. The line, also called Trans-Pyrenean Central Corridor (Travesía Central de los Pirineos) or TCP project, will serve both passenger high-speed trains as well as large freight trains and will connect directly Zaragoza to Toulouse via Huesca, a distance of 355 km in length. Ten possible alternatives are being considered for crossing the mountains, all of them including tunnels at low altitude, and other possible stops include Tarbes or Pau. There is currently no clear provision on its construction.

== Passenger usage ==
The still-growing network transported a record 43.8 million passengers in 2025. Though the network length is extensive, it lags in ridership behind comparable high-speed rail systems in Japan, France, Germany, China, Taiwan, and Korea.

AVE passengers 2006-2025. View chart definition.

AVE passengers in millions from 2006 to 2025
2000s							2006	2007	2008	2009
2000s		.					4.878	5.559	11.461	11.250
2010s	2010	2011	2012	2013	2014	2015	2016	2017	2018	2019
2010s	10.851	12.563	12.101	14.697	17.967	19.428	20.353	20.558	21.334	22.370
2020s	2020	2021	2022	2023	2024	2025	2026	2027	2028	2029
2020s	7.603	12.283	23.562	31.784	39.019	43.786				

== See also ==
=== High-speed rail services in Spain ===
- AVE
- Avant
- Alvia
- Euromed
- Avlo
- Ouigo España
- Iryo

=== Rail infrastructure in Spain and Europe ===
- Rail transport in Spain
- History of rail transport in Spain
- High-speed rail in Europe
- Train categories in Europe
