= Class 121 =

Class 121 may refer to:

- British Rail Class 121
- CIE 121 Class
- Haixiu 121-class tug
- I-121-class submarine
- RENFE Class 120 / 121
