= Class 730 =

Class 730 may refer to:

- British Rail Class 730
- Renfe Class 730
