= Renfe Class 100 =

High speed train type

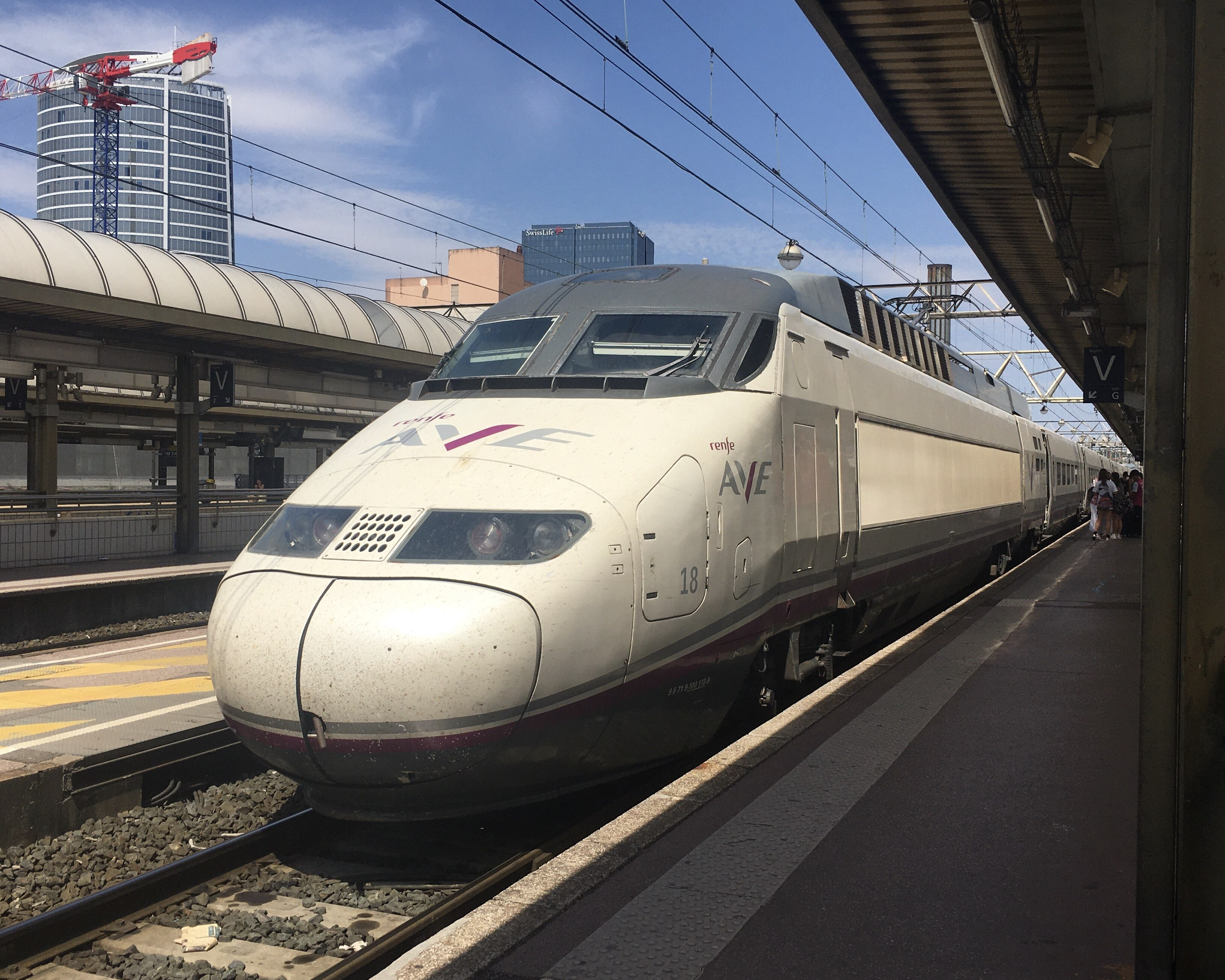
- Series 100 train at Lyon-Part-Dieu station

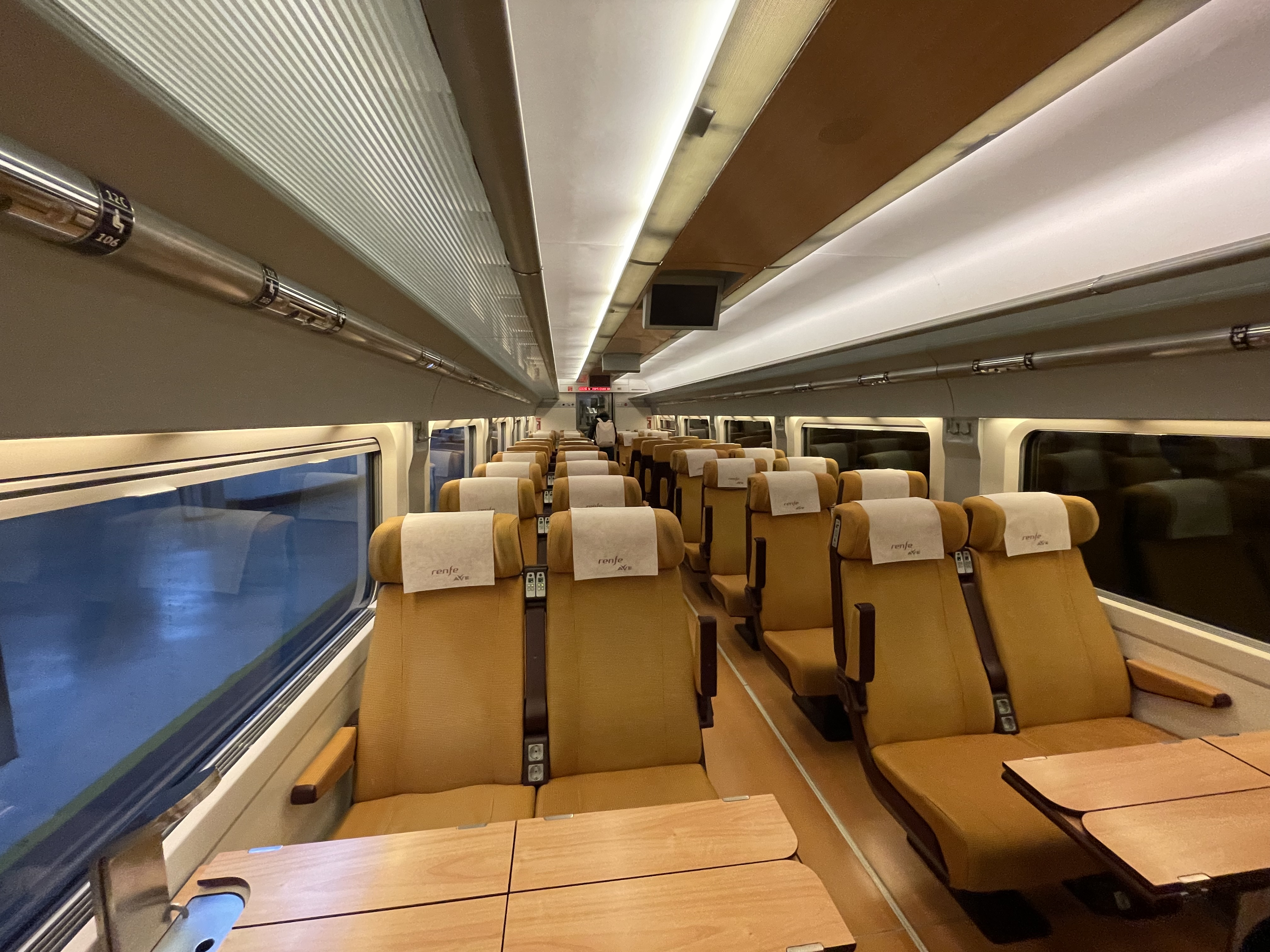
- Interior of an S-100 train
- Stock type: High-speed electric multiple unit
- In service: 1992–present
- Manufacturer: GEC-Alsthom / CAF
- Family name: TGV
- Entered service: April 1992
- Refurbished: 2007–2012
- Number in service: 22 trainsets
- Formation: 10 cars
- Capacity: 329 seats 332 seats after refurbishment
- Operator: Renfe Operadora

Specifications
- Car body construction: Welded steel
- Train length: 200.150 m (656 ft 8 in)
- Car length: Power cars: 22.130 m (72 ft 7 in); End trailers: 21.845 m (71 ft 8 in); Intermediate trailers: 18.700 m (61 ft 4 in)
- Width: Power cars: 2.814 m (9 ft 2 3/4 in); Trailers: 2.904 m (9 ft 6 3/8 in)
- Height: 4.28 m (14 ft 1/2 in)
- Wheelbase: Bogie: 3.000 m (9 ft 10.1 in)
- Maximum speed: 300 km/h (190 mph)
- Weight: 392.6 t (386.4 long tons; 432.8 short tons) empty; 421.5 t (414.8 long tons; 464.6 short tons) normal load
- Axle load: 17.2 t (16.9 long tons; 19.0 short tons)
- Traction system: Thyristor / GTO chopper control
- Traction motors: 8 × self-piloted synchronous three-phase motors
- Power output: 8,800 kW (11,800 hp) at 25 kV AC; 5,400 kW (7,200 hp) under 3 kV DC
- Tractive effort: 220 kN (49,000 lbf) starting; 105.6 kN (23,700 lbf) at 300 km/h (190 mph)
- Auxiliaries: 500 V DC auxiliary supply
- Electric systems: 25 kV 50 Hz AC and 3 kV DC(nominal) from overhead catenary
- Current collection: Pantograph
- UIC classification: Bo′Bo′+2′(2)′(2)′(2)′(2)′(2)′(2)′(2)′2′+Bo′Bo′
- Wheels driven: 16 out of 52
- Braking systems: Rheostatic, electro-pneumatic automatic, immobilisation and parking brakes
- Safety systems: LZB, ASFA
- Coupling system: Scharfenberg coupler
- Track gauge: 1,435 mm (4 ft 8 1/2 in) standard gauge

The Renfe Class 100 is a high-speed train used for AVE services by the Renfe Operadora, in Spain. It was the first high-speed train put into service in Spain, in 1992.

== History ==
This class lived through all the changes involved in the creation of the Spanish high-speed network; originally the plan was to build the high-speed route to Andalusia on an Iberian gauge track (1,668 mm (5 ft 5 21/32 in)). At the last minute, it was decided that it should be 1,435 mm (4 ft 8 1/2 in) standard gauge, meaning RENFE changed its original order for 24 Iberian gauge units to sixteen standard gauge ones, which were delivered between 1991 and 1993.

After various changes in the contract with Alstom and compensation for delays the final eight were delivered; two standard gauge sets and 6 Iberian gauge sets. The Iberian sets became the Renfe Class 101 which used to operate the Euromed services along the Mediterranean corridor (this route is now covered by the RENFE Class 130 trains).

Train 100.015 set one of the most important speed records in Spain, reaching 356.8 kilometres per hour (221.7 mph) on a test run. Its previous record had been 330 km/h (210 mph) on an earlier test run. The Class 100 was also involved in speed tests using Talgo carriages.

In 2002 one of the power cars of set 100.012 was severely damaged in a collision. The car was rebuilt by using the newer TGV-Duplex design, giving this set the unique feature of having two different model power cars.

This class has almost exclusively served the Madrid–Seville high-speed rail line. They were used on the Madrid–Barcelona high-speed rail line for a short period until introduction of the RENFE Class 102. The units used on the Barcelona line had to have their pantographs changed as well as installation of the ERTMS system.

In 2007, after fifteen years of service—half of the trains' expected working life—the entire Class 100 fleet was refurbished.

In February 2011, on account of financial pressures, RENFE announced that, instead of buying 10 new trains to cover the Paris-Madrid route, it would convert AVE Class 100 trains for the route, at a cost of €30 million, rather than €270 million. RENFE announced that the capacity would be increased to keep the cost down, in addition to the conversion work planned for the trains' electrification and signaling systems.

In 2013, some S100 trains have been changed for French homologation making them compatible with French signaling system and so be able to cross the French border. The aim is to create rail service between major French cities and main Spanish cities (Madrid and Barcelona) simultaneously with SNCF. The S100 trains ran this service from 2013, following the cancellation of overnight services from Paris to Madrid and Barcelona, till 2022.

Air Nostrum proposed to lease some from RENFE to operate services from Madrid Atocha to Gare de Montpellier-Saint-Roch from October 2018, however as of September 2025, this has not happened.

== Technical information ==
The Series 100 is directly derived from the TGV Atlantique trains that operate in France. Eight sets were manufactured by Alstom and the remainder by CAF.

A Series 100 train is made up of two 4,400 kW power cars with two motorized bogies each and eight passenger cars with shared bogies. It is compatible with the 1,435 mm (4 ft 8 1/2 in) standard gauge. It is compatible with overhead currents of 3 kV DC and 25 kV 50 Hz alternating current.

Unlike its model, it has both the ASFA 200 (used in Spain) and Linienzugbeeinflussung (used in Germany and in Spain) signaling systems. Furthermore, since 2004 nine of the trains have the ERTMS system installed, as well as two extra coaches and cooling systems specially adapted to temperatures in Spain.

== See also ==
- List of high-speed trains
- TGV Atlantique
- Renfe Class 102
- Renfe Class 103
