= Haixiu 121-class tug =

Chinese naval auxiliary ship class

Class overview
- Operators: People's Liberation Army Navy

General characteristics
- Class & type: Haixiu 121
- Electronic warfare & decoys: None
- Armament: Unarmed
- Aircraft carried: None
- Aviation facilities: None

Haixiu 121 class tug is a class of naval auxiliary ship currently in service with the People's Liberation Army Navy (PLAN). The class is named after the first unit commissioned, and only a single unit of this class is known to be in active service.

The designation Haixiu 121 is unique in that it is different from the usual Chinese naming convention for ships in military service. Ordinarily, auxiliary ships in PLAN service are designated by a combination of two or more Chinese characters followed by three-digit number. The first Chinese character denotes which fleet the ship belongs to—East (东; dōng) for East Sea Fleet, North (北; běi) for North Sea Fleet, and South (南; nán) for South Sea Fleet. The second indicates the function the ship performs, usually 拖; tuō for tugboats. Haixiu 121 is a tug, but is designated a repair ship 海修; hǎi xiū). The pennant numbers may have changed due to a change of Chinese naval ships naming convention.

| Class | Pennant # | Status |
|---|---|---|
| Haixiu 121 class | Hai-Xiu 655 | Active |
