= Renfe Class 730 =

High-speed train type

Renfe Class 730 Talgo 250
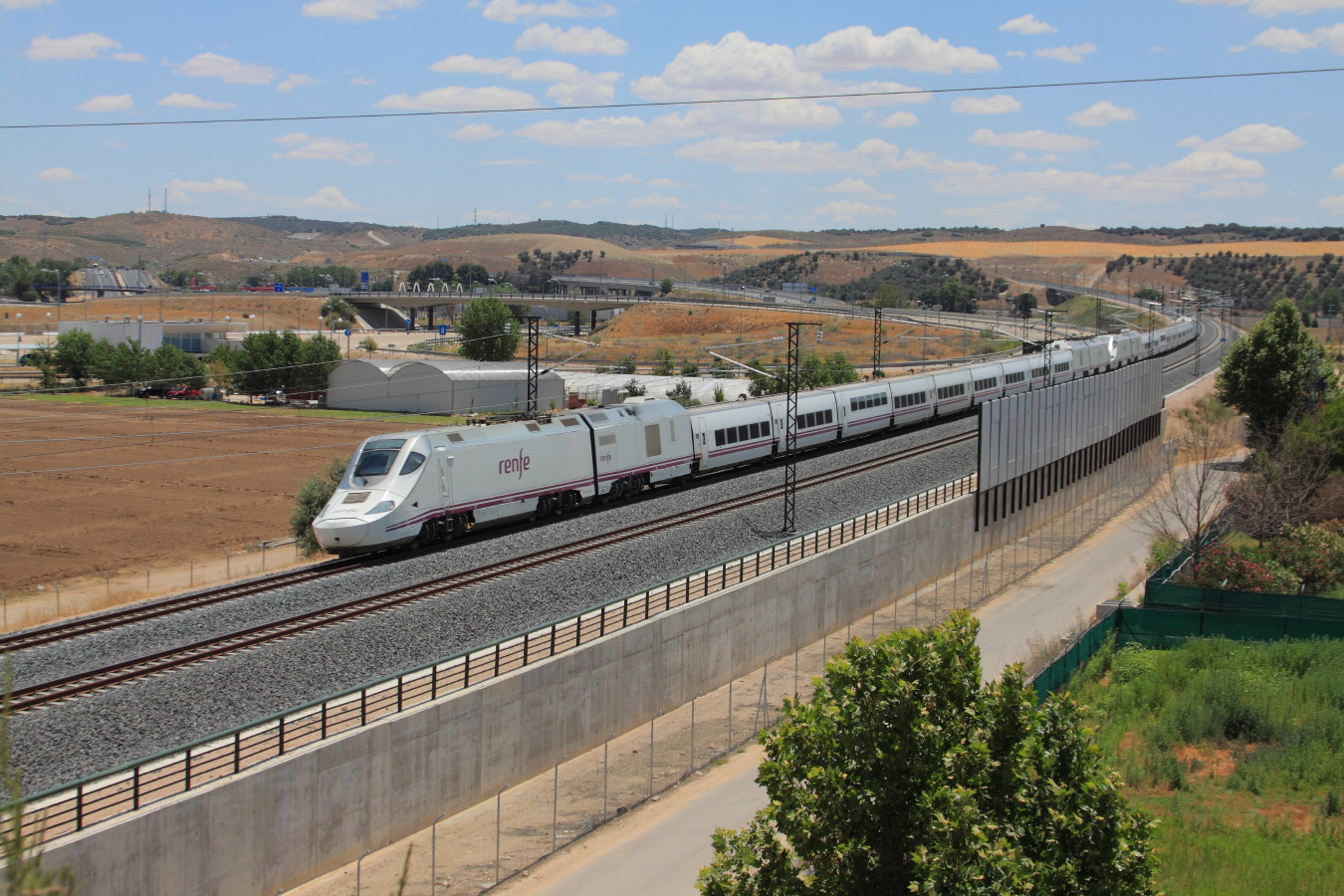
- A Class 730 near Aranjuez, Madrid
- Manufacturer: Talgo / Bombardier (Kassel)
- Constructed: 2012
- Entered service: 2012
- Number built: 15
- Capacity: 9 coach set: 265 seats, 216 standard, 48 first, 1 special
- Operator: Renfe

Specifications
- Train length: 185.6 m (608 ft 11.1 in)
- Car length: 20 m (65 ft 7.4 in) (power car); 13.14 m (43 ft 1.3 in) (passenger car)
- Width: 2.96 m (9 ft 8.54 in) (power car)
- Height: 4 m (13 ft 1.48 in) (power car)
- Maximum speed: Diesel: 190 km/h (118 mph); Electric: 250 km/h (155 mph)
- Weight: 361 t
- Axle load: max. axle load 18 t (17.7 long tons; 19.8 short tons)
- Traction system: Electro-diesel (dual-mode)
- Prime mover: 2x MTU 12V 4000 R43L (S730)
- Power output: 2,400 kW (3,200 hp) @ 25 kV AC; 2,000 kW (2,700 hp) @ 3 kV DC (per power unit); 1,800 kW (2,400 hp) per power car in diesel mode (S730)
- Transmission: Electric
- Electric systems: 25 kV 50 Hz AC and 3 kV DC (nominal) from overhead catenary
- Current collection: Pantograph (2 per power car) high voltage roof mounted electrical bus between power cars.
- UIC classification: Bo′Bo′+2′(1)′(1)′(1)′(1)′(1)′(1)′(1)′(1)′(1)′2′+Bo′Bo′
- Braking systems: 2 disc brakes per axle regenerative and rheostatic brakes in power cars pneumatic discs in passenger cars
- Multiple working: Yes
- Track gauge: 1,435 mm (4 ft 8 1/2 in) / 1,668 mm (5 ft 5 21/32 in)

The Renfe Class 730 or S-730 (Spanish: Serie 730 de Renfe, manufacturer's designation Talgo 250 Dual) is a top and tail high-speed dual-gauge, dual-voltage and hybrid (electric and diesel) trainset consisting of 9 Talgo VII tilting coaches, two intermediate diesel-generator cars and two head electric power cars, used on Alvia services. The class have been nicknamed patitos (ducklings/little ducks), due to the shape of the train nose. They are a variant of RENFE Class 130 modified to be able to run on both electric and diesel power, in order to extend higher-quality services to parts of Spain not on the electrified network.

== Background and design ==
The trainsets are designed for high-speed services on conventional Iberian gauge (1,668 mm (5 ft 5 21/32 in)) network and standard-gauge high-speed (1,435 mm (4 ft 8 1/2 in)) lines; they can change gauge at low speed without stopping using Talgo's RD variable gauge system. The carriages are constructed from aluminium and incorporate the Talgo Pendular passive pendulum tilting system, are sealed against pressure differences for tunnel travel, and have underframe air conditioning, individual audio systems and video displays, rotating and reclining seats and power outlets.

The trainset consists of 13 cars, including 2 electric power cars, 2 diesel-generator cars and 9 passenger coaches between them. The power cars are technically special single-sided electric locomotives and do not have seats for passengers, nor do the diesel generator cars coupled behind them instead of the end passenger coaches of the Class 130 series trains. Diesel generator cars and passenger coaches have an articulated connection with common bogies. Passenger coaches including 6 second class coaches, 2 first class coaches and 1 bistro coach for restaurant/sales services. Capacity in standard class is 36 seated, in first class — 26 seats in one coach and 22 seats in another coach, which also has a single place for disabled people.

The power cars use AC traction motors controlled by IGBT inverters which include integrated auxiliary inverters. Signalling systems can include ETCS Level 2, LZB, ASFA and Ebicab900TBS.

== 2013 Santiago de Compostela accident ==
On 24 July 2013 a Renfe Class S730 running as the Alvia 4155 service from Madrid to Ferrol derailed in north-western Spain, killing 79, out of 218 passengers on board. The cause of the accident is not yet officially determined, but the train was alleged to be traveling over twice the posted speed limit while entering a curve, due to the absence of European Rail Traffic Management System (ERTMS).

== See also ==
- Renfe Class 130
- List of high-speed trains
- Stamps with Renfe Class 730
