= Villaprovedo =

- Municipality and town
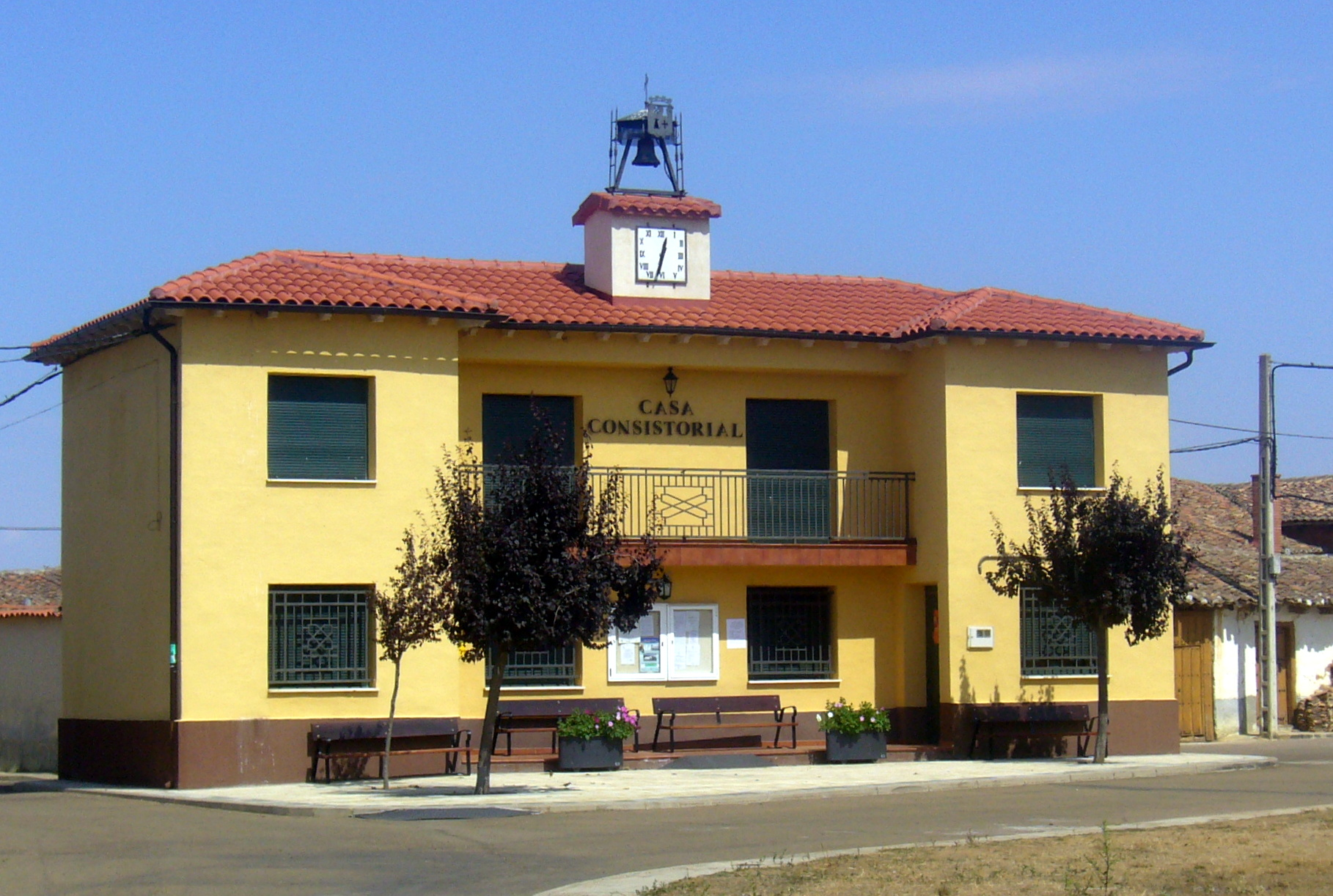
- Interactive map of Villaprovedo
- Coordinates: 42°30′56″N 4°23′44″W
- Country: Spain
- Autonomous community: Castile and León
- Province: Palencia
- Comarca: Boedo-Ojeda

Area
  - Total: 26.4 km^{2} (10.2 sq mi)
- Elevation: 855 m (2,805 ft)

Population (2025-01-01)
  - Total: 46
  - Density: 1.7/km^{2} (4.5/sq mi)
- Time zone: UTC+1 (CET)
  - Summer (DST): UTC+2 (CEST)
- Postal code: 34491
- Website: Official website

Villaprovedo is a municipality located in the province of Palencia, Castile and León, Spain. According to the 2022 census (INE), the municipality has a population of 50 inhabitants.
