= Monforte del Cid =

Village in Spain

Coordinates: 38°23′N 0°43′W

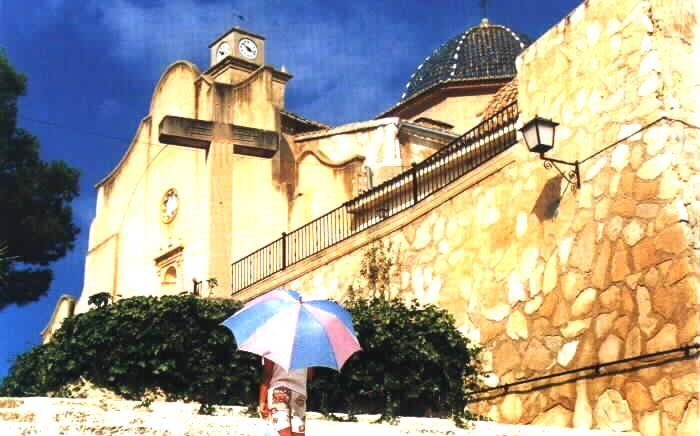
Church in 1994

Monforte del Cid's flag

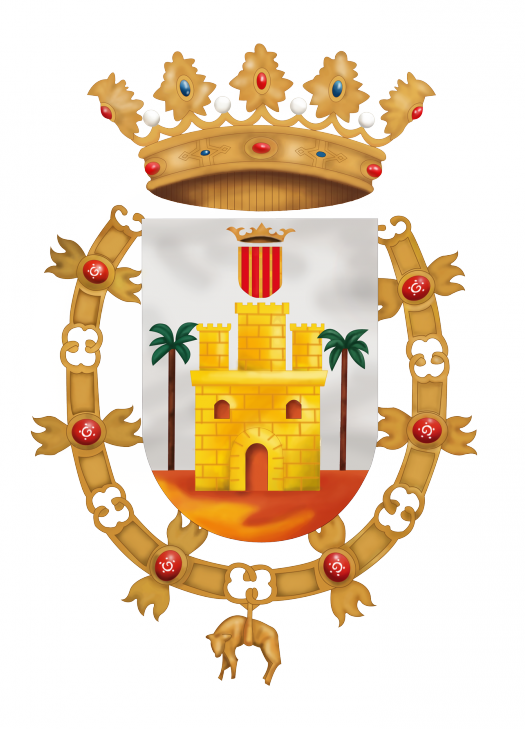
Monforte del Cid's coat of arms

Monforte del Cid is a village in the province of Alicante and autonomous community of Valencia, Spain. The municipality covers an area of 79.5 square kilometres (30.7 sq mi) and as of 2011 had a population of 7,771 people.

== Toponymy ==
See also: Mons Fortis (toponym) . In the thirteenth century, the town was called Nompot (as stated in the charter of the city of Alicante). On December 28 of 1328 the king Alfonso "El Benigno" gave Nompot village as part of a series of towns and villages in inheritance to his other son, the infant "Fernando de la Cerda". In an account book of Don Fernando from 1355, it already mentions the town with the name of "Monfort".

After the conflict of "The Two Pedros" between Pedro I of Castile and Pedro IV of Aragon, Monfort tried to separate from the Crown of Aragon to switch to that of Castile. In punishment, Pedro IV demoted it back to the "village", returned the toponym "Nompot" and passed a law that said the population would remain "im perpetuom" to the, by then, Villa de Alicante. Approximately five years later, it retrieved the name of Monfort.

In 1708 the name was "translated" into Spanish as "Monforte" and in 1916, the Presidency of the Council of Ministers, according to Royal Decree of June 27 of 1916, adopted the name as "Monforte de la Rambla". But that same year, at a meeting at City Hall at the request of the majority of the population (who did not like that name) formally requested the change of name to the current "Monforte del Cid"; SIENDA approved the request by Royal Decree of 4 December 1916.

== Geography ==
The municipality of Monforte del Cid is in the Vinalopó district, located in the geographical transition area from the mountain corridors to the arid interior plains of coastal Alicante. It is nestled in the center of the middle Valley of Vinalopó at an elevation of 230 metres (750 ft) and has an area of 79.5 km^{2} (30.7 sq mi). It sits on a hill crowned by a medieval castle converted into a 17th century parish Church.

Among the most important mountain ranges in the area are the Sierra del Cid, with border populations at Elda and Petrel, and the Sierra de las Aguilas, near the border with the city of Alicante or Portichol, at 330 m (1,080 ft) high above sea level. The village of Orito is an important pilgrimage center for the veneration of the Roman Catholic saint, Paschal Baylón, who made his profession as a lay Religious brother at the Saint Joseph convent there. Several housing estates are located near Portichol, bordering the towns of Alicante, Elche, Aspe, Novelda, Agost and Petrel. The town is 21 km (13 mi) from Alicante, with easy access from the A-31 road.
