= Madrid–Toledo high-speed rail line =

Railway line in Spain

The LAV Madrid-Toledo is a Spanish high-speed rail line that connects the cities of Madrid and Toledo, a distance of approximately 74 kilometres (46 mi).

The service was inaugurated in 2005.

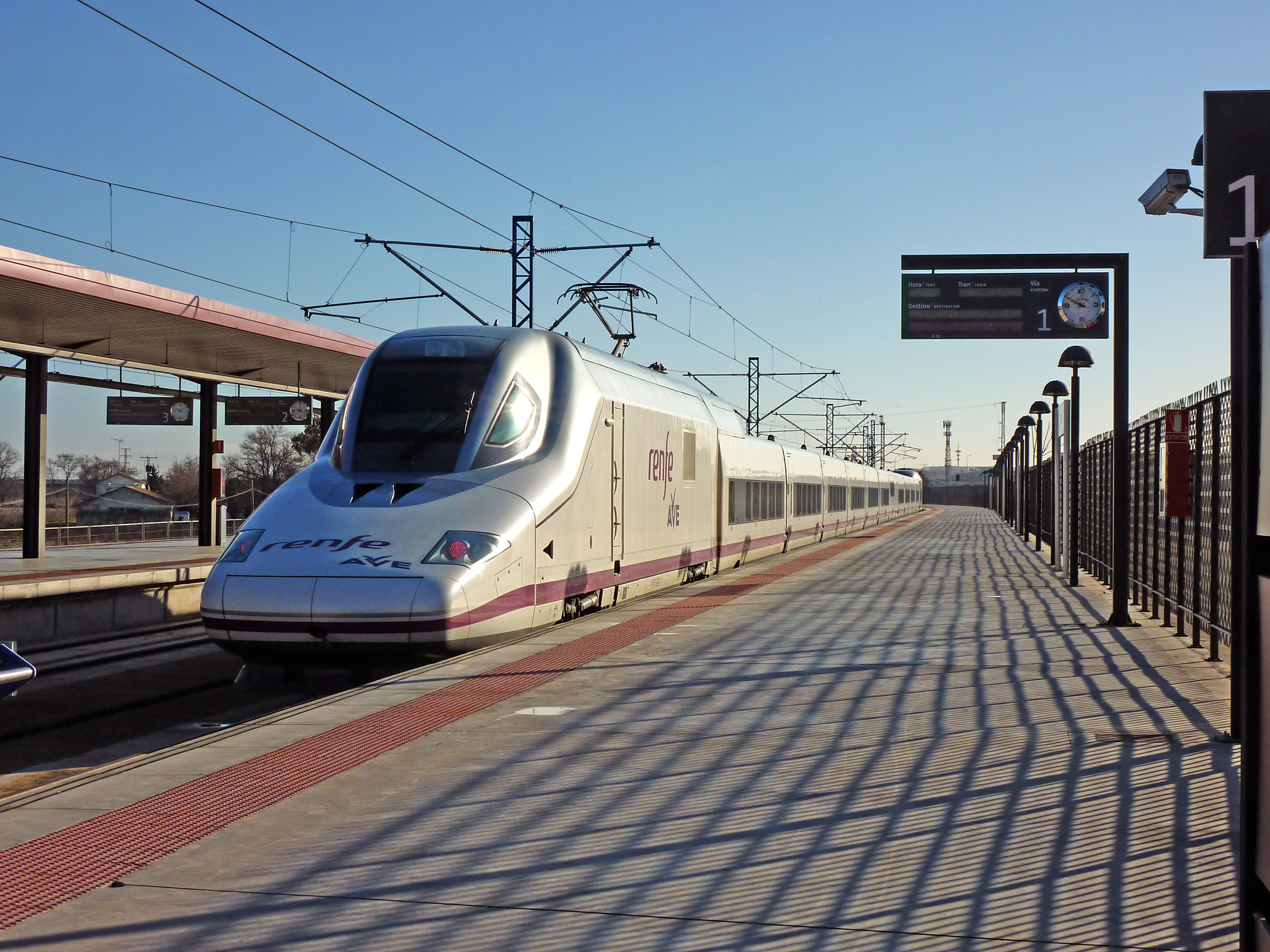
AVE train Class 112 entering the railway station of Toledo in 2011. The circulation of trains of this class on this line was discontinued a few months after.

== Route ==
The route shares the first 53 kilometres (33 mi) with the Madrid–Seville high-speed rail line. From La Sagra trains for Toledo travel on a dedicated branch line of 21 kilometres (13 mi) to the terminus in Toledo. The trip takes thirty minutes.

== Features ==
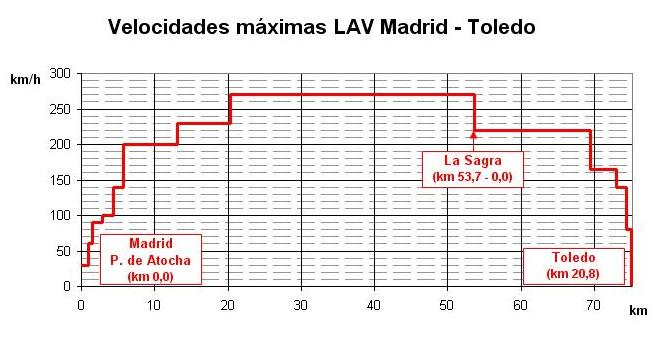
Maximum speeds profile of the line Madrid-Toledo

The new portion of the line was designed to support maximum speeds of 220 km/h, whereas the maximum speed allowed by the common core shared with the LAV Madrid-Sevilla/Málaga. is 270 km/h Like all Spanish LAV's, the line has a track gauge of 1,435 mm (4 ft 8 1/2 in) standard gauge and is electrified at 25 kV AC.

== Toledo Station ==
The arrival of high speed rail to Toledo made clear the need to adapt the station to new needs. This was done by rehabilitating the historic station building, designed by architect Narciso Claveria in the Neo-Mudéjar style and opened in 1919.

Other amenities include an outdoor parking area. The parking lot is paved, lit, and covers an area of 7,500 square meters with capacity for 325 vehicles.

== Special Features ==
A highlight of the line is a one-mile viaduct spanning the Tagus River and the Valdecir stream.
