= Renfe Class 130 =

High speed train type

Renfe Class 130 Talgo 250
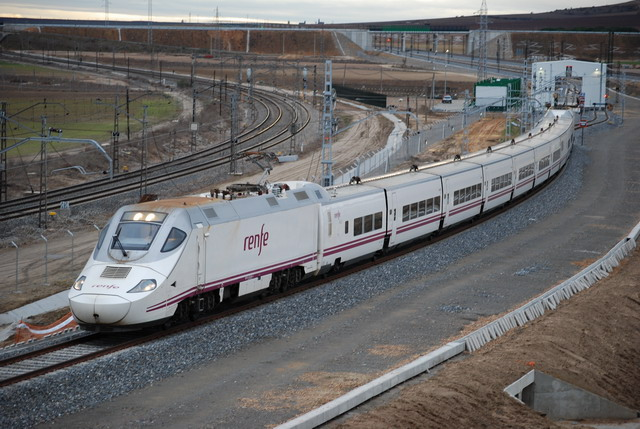
- Renfe Class 130 at the Valdestillas gauge changer
- Stock type: High-speed variable-gauge electric trainset
- In service: 2007–present
- Manufacturer: Talgo / Bombardier
- Assembly: Las Matas
- Built at: Talgo Rivabellosa and Las Matas II; Bombardier Kassel
- Family name: Talgo 250
- Entered service: 29 October 2007
- Number built: 45
- Formation: 13 cars: 2 power cars and 11 Talgo Series 7 passenger trailers
- Capacity: 299 seats: 236 standard and 63 first class
- Operator: Renfe Operadora

Specifications
- Car body construction: Aluminium alloy
- Train length: 184.158 m (604 ft 2.3 in)
- Car length: Power cars: 20.749 m (68 ft 0.9 in); Intermediate trailers: 13.140 m (43 ft 1.3 in); End trailers: 12.140 m (39 ft 10.0 in)
- Width: Power cars: 2.960 m (9 ft 8.54 in); Trailers: 2.942 m (9 ft 7.83 in)
- Height: Power cars: 4.030 m (13 ft 2.66 in); Trailers: 3.365 m (11 ft 0.48 in)
- Floor height: 760 mm (30 in)
- Platform height: 550 mm (22 in) or 760 mm (30 in)
- Doors: 16 sliding access doors, 8 per side
- Maximum speed: 250 km/h (155 mph) on standard gauge; 220 km/h (137 mph) on Iberian gauge
- Weight: 312 t (307 long tons; 344 short tons)
- Axle load: 18 t (18 long tons; 20 short tons) per motor axle
- Traction system: Water-cooled IGBT
- Traction motors: 8 × three-phase asynchronous motors
- Power output: 4,800 kW (6,400 hp) at 25 kV AC; 4,000 kW (5,400 hp) at 3 kV DC
- Tractive effort: 220 kN (49,000 lbf) maximum; 160 kN (36,000 lbf) continuous
- Auxiliaries: Static converters in the end first-class and standard cars; 380 V, 50 Hz auxiliary supply
- Electric systems: Overhead catenary: 25 kV 50 Hz AC AC; 3 kV DC
- Current collection: Pantograph; 2 per power car
- Wheels driven: 16
- Bogies: 4 motor bogies and 12 Talgo wheelsets; 20 axles total
- Braking systems: Regenerative, rheostatic and pneumatic disc brakes; ABS on motor-axle pneumatic brakes
- Safety systems: ETCS/ERTMS levels 1 and 2, LZB STM, ATP Edicab, ASFA
- Coupling system: Scharfenberg coupler
- Track gauge: 1,435 mm (4 ft 8 1/2 in) standard gauge; 1,668 mm (5 ft 5 21/32 in) Iberian gauge

Notes/references
- Uses Talgo RD gauge changing equipment.

The Renfe Class 130 or S-130 (Spanish: Serie 130 de Renfe, manufacturer's designation Talgo 250) is a top and tail high-speed dual-gauge, dual-voltage trainset consisting of 11 Talgo VII tilting coaches and two power cars, used on Alvia and Euromed services. The class have been nicknamed patitos (ducklings), due to the shape of the train nose.

== Background and design ==
The trainsets are designed for high-speed services on Iberian gauge (1,668 mm (5 ft 5 21/32 in)) and high-speed (1,435 mm (4 ft 8 1/2 in)) lines; they can change gauge at low speed without stopping using Talgo's RD variable gauge system. The carriages are constructed from aluminium and incorporate the Talgo Pendular passive pendulum tilting system, are sealed against pressure differences for tunnel travel, and have underframe air conditioning, individual audio systems and video displays, rotating and reclining seats and power outlets.

Capacity in standard class is 36 seated, in first class 26 seats, end coaches have lower capacity, one coach is typically used for restaurant/sales services.

The power cars use AC traction motors controlled by IGBT inverters which include integrated auxiliary inverters. Signalling systems can include ETCS Level 2, LZB, ASFA and Ebicab900TBS.

== Operations and services ==
As of January 2010 they operated from Gijón/Oviedo via León, Palencia, Valladolid to Madrid with some trains extended to Alicante via Albacete; Santander via Palencia and Valladolid to Madrid, sometimes extended to Alicante; Madrid to Bilbao via Valladolid and Burgos; Madrid to San Sebastian/Irun via Valladolid, Burgos and Vitoria; Madrid to Alicante; Huelva and Cádiz and Madrid to Murcia.

Since January 2020 Renfe Class 130 operate on the Figueres–Alicante route via Girona, Barcelona, Camp de Tarragona, Castellón de la Plana and Valencia for the Euromed services.

On services such as Gijón–Madrid they have been replaced by Renfe Class 120 trainsets (2011).

== Developments ==
=== Renfe Class 730 ===
In order to extend high-quality services to parts of Spain not on the high-speed network Renfe acquired hybrid trains with both electric and diesel power for delivery in 2012 for use from Madrid to Murcia and Galicia, built by Talgo and Bombardier, at a cost of 78 million euro. The new trains based on the S-130 were initially coded S130H, later S730;

Fifteen sets S-130 units will be converted to hybrid operation. with two generator cars per set using MTU 12V 4000 R43L engines (1.8MW each). The top speed in diesel mode is 180 km/h (112 mph). Testing of the trains took place in 2011 with introduction into service expected in 2012.

=== 250km/h+ prototype train ===
A gauge-changing train capable of over 250 km/h (155 mph) is in development and is based on the S-130.

=== Uzbekistan trainset order ===
A version of the S130 for Uzbekistan Temir Yollari was ordered in 2009 for use on a Tashkent–Samarkand high-speed line. Deliveries of the order of two trains began in July 2011.

Two more sets were constructed in 2017, following expansion of the service.

== See also ==
- ICE trains
  - ICE 1
  - ICE 2
- ETR 500
- TGV trains
  - TGV Sud-Est
  - TGV Atlantique
  - TGV Reseau
  - TGV POS
  - TGV Duplex
  - Euroduplex
  - Thalys PBA
  - TGV TMST
- List of high-speed trains
- Stamps with Renfe Class 130
