= Renfe Class 120 / 121 =

High-speed train type

Renfe Class 120/121
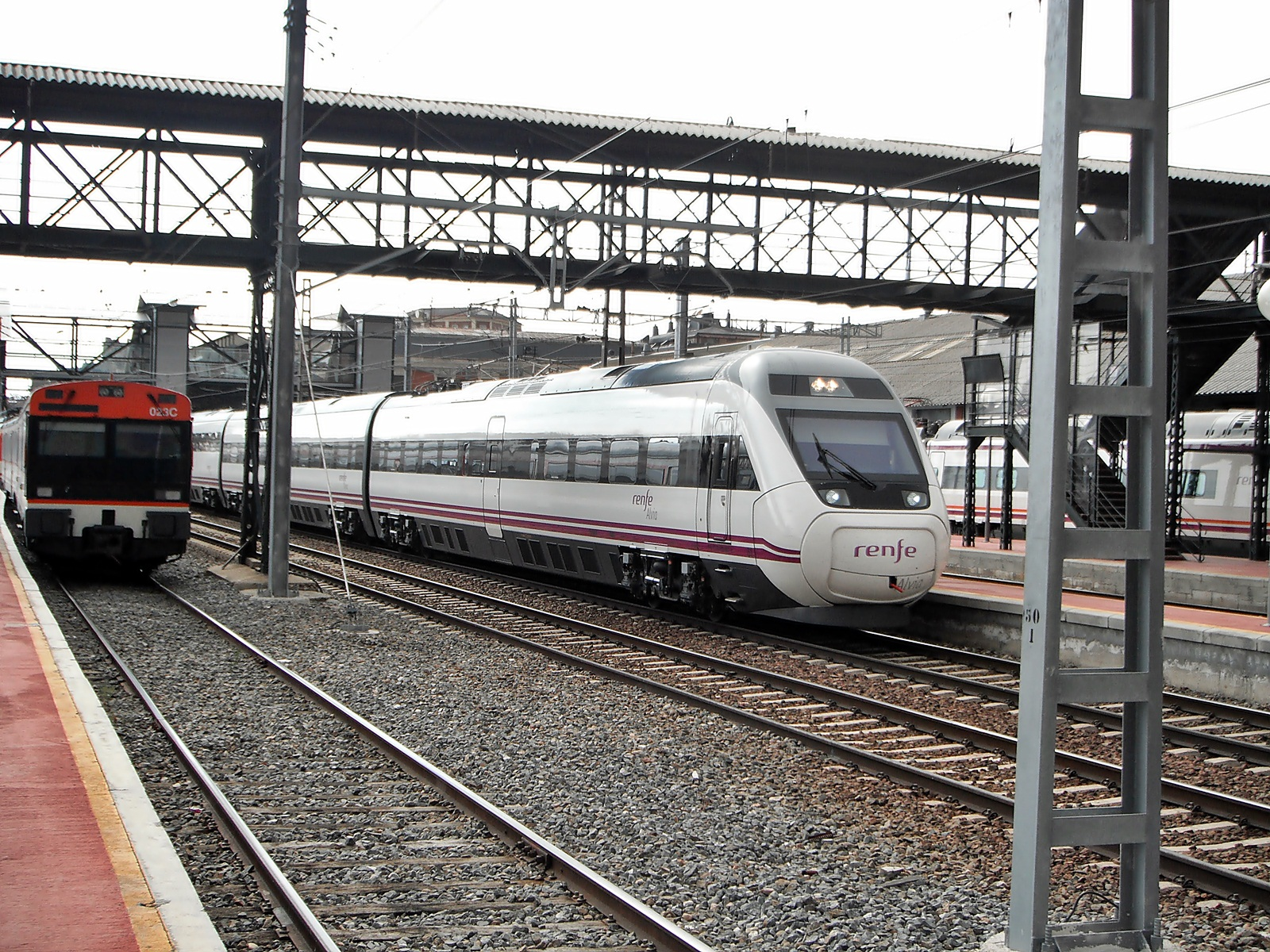
- Renfe 120-6051 at Valladolid - Campo Grande (Valladolid)
- Manufacturer: CAF / Alstom
- Constructed: 2001 (order date) 12 units; 2004 (order date) 45 units
- Formation: 4-car sets MCT-MIT-MIP-MCP (120); Mc-M-M-Mc (121)
- Capacity: Class 120: 237 (+1 reserved); Class 121: 280 (+2)
- Operator: Renfe

Specifications
- Car body construction: Aluminium
- Train length: 106.23 m (348 ft 6 in)
- Car length: 27.35 m (89 ft 9 in) (end cars); 25.78 m (84 ft 7 in) (intermediate cars)
- Width: 2.92 m (9 ft 7 in)
- Height: 4.1 m (13 ft 5 in)
- Floor height: 1.3 m (51 in)
- Doors: 1 per side
- Maximum speed: 250 km/h (155 mph)
- Weight: 225 tonnes (221 long tons; 248 short tons) empty)
- Axle load: 15.6 t (15.4 long tons; 17.2 short tons)
- Traction system: IGBT–VVVF
- Traction motors: 8 × 512 kW (687 hp) 3-phase AC induction motor
- Power output: 4 MW (5,400 hp) (25 kV AC), 2.7 MW (3,600 hp) (3 kV DC)
- Transmission: Body mounted motor via cardan shaft to inner axle of each bogie.
- Acceleration: 0.52 m/s^{2} (1.7 ft/s^{2})
- Deceleration: 0.50 m/s^{2} (1.6 ft/s^{2}) @ 120 km/h (75 mph); 0.35 m/s^{2} (1.1 ft/s^{2}) @ 250 km/h (160 mph)
- Electric systems: 3 kV DC (nominal) and 25 kV 50 Hz AC (nominal) from overhead catenary
- Current collection: Pantograph
- UIC classification: (1A)(A1)+(1A)(A1)+(1A)(A1)+(1A)(A1)
- Braking systems: regenerative/rheostatic and pneumatic disc brakes
- Safety system: ERTMS N1/2
- Multiple working: 2 trainsets
- Track gauge: 1,668 mm (5 ft 5 21/32 in) Iberian gauge/; 1,435 mm (4 ft 8 1/2 in) standard gauge

The Renfe Class 120 are electric multiple units used on Alvia high-speed rail services in Spain.

The trainsets are dual-voltage, dual-gauge units capable of changing gauge without stopping at 30 km/h (19 mph). Twelve units were ordered in 2001, and a further 45 units in 2004

29 units of the class Renfe Class 121 were ordered for medium-distance high-speed Avant services. The units are very similar to the Class 120 but include additional electrical equipment for redundancy (a requirement for trains using the Guadarrama Tunnel), and do not provide first class seating, raising the number of seats to 282.

== Design ==
=== Class 120 ===
The trainsets are 4-unit multiple units capable of operating in pairs, designed for medium-distance high-speed services. The inner axle of each carriage bogie is powered by a body mounted three phase asynchronous traction motor via a cardan shaft final drive. The motors are driven by IGBT converters with one converter per carriage. The bogies are of welded steel construction with primary coil springs and secondary air suspension. Tractive forces are transmitted by a drag pivot pin.

The bogies incorporate CAF's BRAVA (Bogie de Rodadura de Ancho Variable Autopropulsado) system which allows gauge-changing without stopping and operating speeds of up to 275 km/h (171 mph) The maximum axleload is 15.6 tonnes (15.4 long tons; 17.2 short tons).

The vehicles are air conditioned with one toilet per car. Passenger services include individual audio systems, and audio and visual information systems. One seat is reserved for disabled passengers, and wheelchair ramps are fitted. The driver's cab is also air conditioned, and the train is equipped with GSM-R systems.

There are 156 seats in 'standard' accommodation and 82 seats in 'first class'.

=== Class 121 ===
The 121 class are built to the same design as the original 120 Class but have additional electrical equipment (duplicated for redundancy). Additionally all the seating is in [2+2] formation increasing the capacity to 282.

== Operations ==
=== Class 120 ===
The first trainset was produced in 2004 and began testing. Services on the Madrid to Barcelona line began in 2006.

The trainsets have operated on the Madrid-Pamplona-Hendaye, Madrid-Logroño, Barcelona-Vigo and Barcelona-Bilbao/Irun lines.

=== Class 121 ===
The first trains entered service on the Madrid-Segovia-Valladolid line on 26 January 2009. They are currently used for the Avant services Barcelona-Lleida, A Coruña-Ourense and Zaragoza-Calatayud and for the Intercity service Madrid-Gijón.

== Related vehicles ==
The 6-car TCDD HT65000 electric multiple units ordered from CAF by the Turkish State Railways for the Istanbul-Ankara high-speed line are based upon the Class 120 design.

== Accidents and incidents ==
- 18 January 2026: At 19:39 CET, train set number 61 of the Renfe Class 120 was involved in a major double derailment near Adamuz, Córdoba. The accident was initiated when a Frecciarossa 1000 operated by Iryo, traveling on the adjacent track, derailed and obstructed the path of the oncoming Class 120. The resulting collision led to the derailment of the Class 120 unit. The disaster resulted in at least 46 fatalities and 245 injuries, with 15 passengers reported in critical condition.

== See also ==
- High-speed rail in Spain
- List of high-speed trains
