= Bobadilla railway station =

Bobadilla
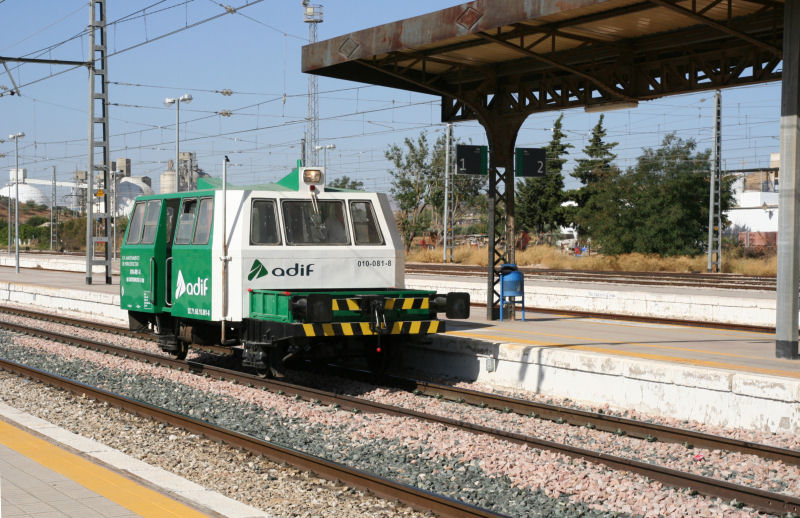

General information
- Location: Bobadilla, Andalusia; Spain
- Coordinates: 37.0375°N 4.7276°W
- Owner: Adif
- Lines: Córdoba–Málaga railway; Algeciras-Bobadilla railway
- Platforms: 3

History
- Opened: 15 August 1865

Passengers
- 2018: 45,481
Location

Bobadilla railway station (known in Spanish as estación de Bobadilla), is a southern Spanish railway station located west of the village of Bobadilla, Province of Málaga.

The station opened in 1865. Later in the 19th century, Bobadilla developed into a railway junction on the Córdoba–Málaga railway line with branch lines to Granada and Algeciras. However, it has become less important following Spain's investment in AVE high-speed services. Much of the long-distance traffic has shifted to the Madrid–Málaga high-speed rail line which opened in 2013.

== History ==
A branch line to Granada was built in the 1870s.

In 1891 the Algeciras-Bobadilla railway line was built to Algeciras from Bobadilla by the Algeciras Gibraltar Railway Company.

On 30 March 1950, a mail train from Madrid to Málaga derailed on a set of points in Bobadilla station, killing 8 people and injuring 30.

Preceding station	Renfe Operadora	Following station
Pedrera towards Seville-Santa Justa	Media Distancia 67	El Chorro towards Málaga María Zambrano
Fuente de la Piedra towards Córdoba	Media Distancia 69	Terminus
Campillos towards Ronda	Media Distancia 70	El Chorro towards Málaga María Zambrano
Campillos towards Algeciras	Media Distancia 70	Antequera-Santa Ana towards Granada
