= Transport in Gibraltar =

Transportation in Gibraltar includes roadway, bus, air, aerial cable car and sea. Due to Gibraltar's compact size and density, walking is the most popular mode of transport making up 48% of trips. Private vehicles make up 30% of trips while a further 15% of trips are made on motorcycles or mopeds.

== Road ==
=== Private transport ===
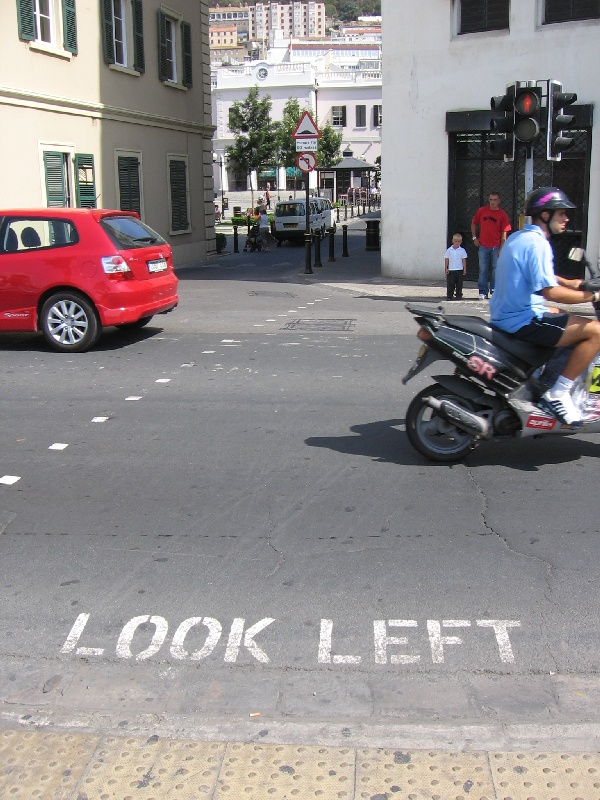
Traffic drives on the right

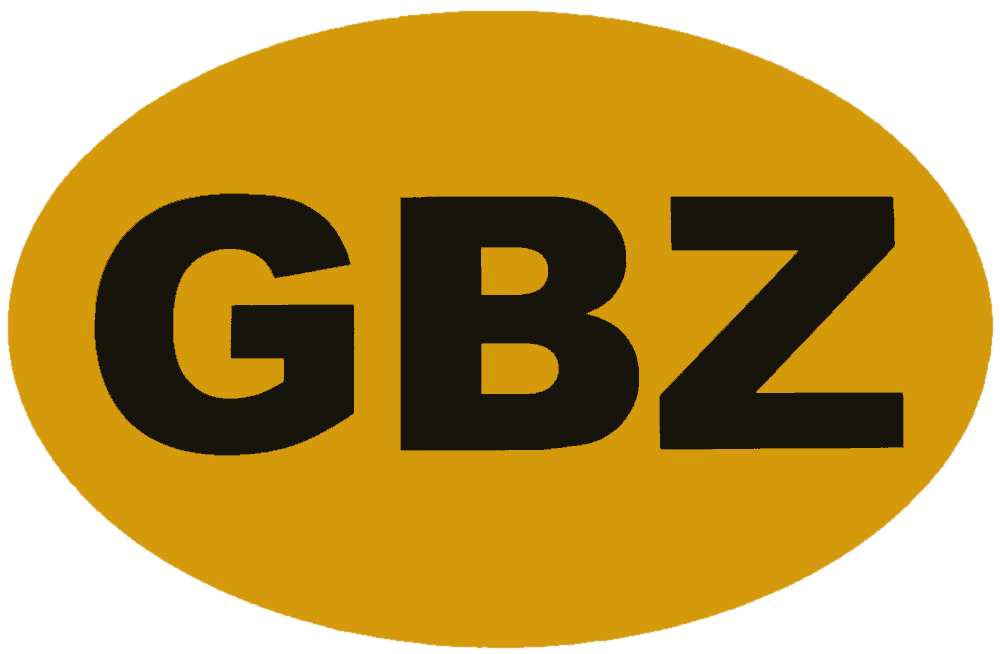
Gibraltar's country identifier is GBZ

Gibraltar has 49.9 kilometres (31.0 mi) of highways, all of which are paved. It has one of the highest levels of per capita car ownership in the world, with as many motor vehicles as people. Unlike the United Kingdom and other British Overseas Territories, traffic in Gibraltar drives on the right, as it shares a land border with Spain. Traffic formerly drove on the left; the change to driving on the right was made at 5.00 a.m. on 16 June 1929. Speed limits are stated in km/hour. Distances, height limits, width limits, and weight limits are stated in metric units, sometimes accompanied by imperial units.

Older roads in Gibraltar, primarily in the city centre, are fairly narrow. The national speed limit is 50 km/hour, and is 35 km/h for buses and vehicles registered to carry goods. Signs showing speed limits lower than the national speed limit apply to all classes of vehicles.

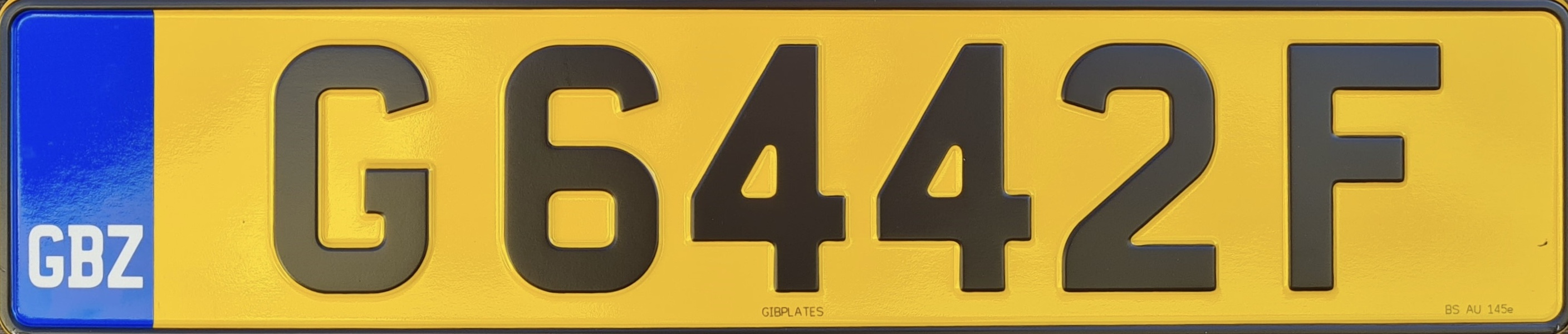
A current Gibraltar rear number plate featuring the country identifier GBZ

Gibraltar's international vehicle registration is GBZ, and vehicle registration plates of Gibraltar consist of the letter 'G' followed by up to five digits (1-99999) or four digits (1000-9999) and a single letter. These are as standard, the same shape, type face and colours as those in the UK, however non-standard number plates have been permitted. The Chief Minister's official car has the registration number G1, while the Governor's car, following tradition, has a crown, in place of a number.

The two highways in Spain leading in the vicinity are the A-383 which ends in La Linea, and the CA-34, which leads to the border.

The traditional sole road into Spain, Winston Churchill Avenue, intersected with the airport's runway requiring movable barricades to close when aircraft landed or departed resulting in congestion. A new tunnel was constructed to solve this problem although delays pushed back its official opening until 31 March 2023. The new road and tunnel is named Kingsway with the approval of Charles III and passes under the terminal and the eastern edge of the runway before connecting with Devil's Tower Road. Runway access is now closed to everyday road traffic but is still available for exceptional or emergency use as well as pedestrians, cyclists and mobility scooters.

Gibraltar has ten fuelling stations, and fuel prices are lower than in neighbouring Spain due to lower fuel duty. Some people from Spain even enter Gibraltar for the sole purpose of purchasing fuel.

=== Public transport ===
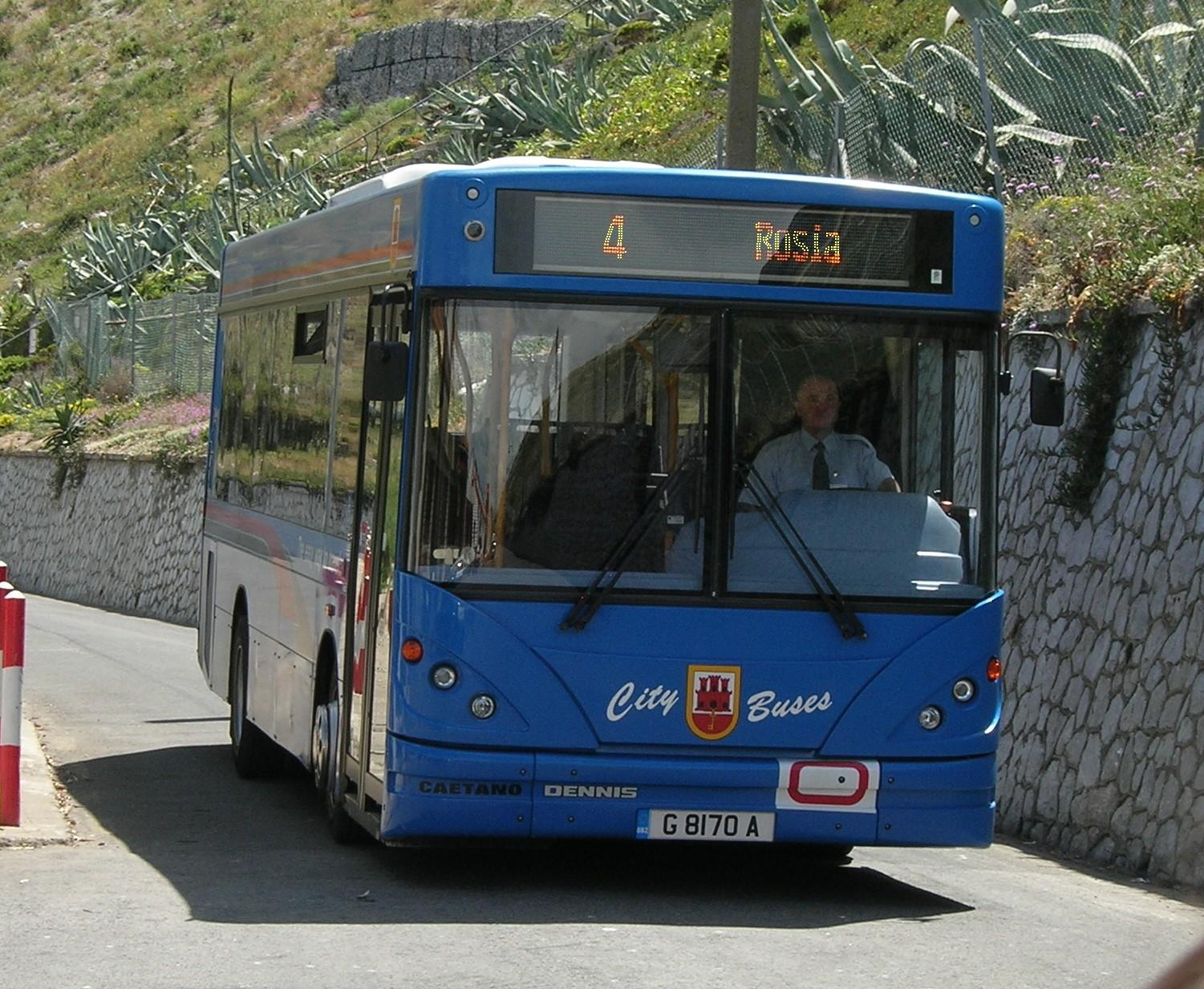
Gibraltar Bus Company Dennis Dart on route 4 at the Both Worlds bus terminus, Sandy Bay.

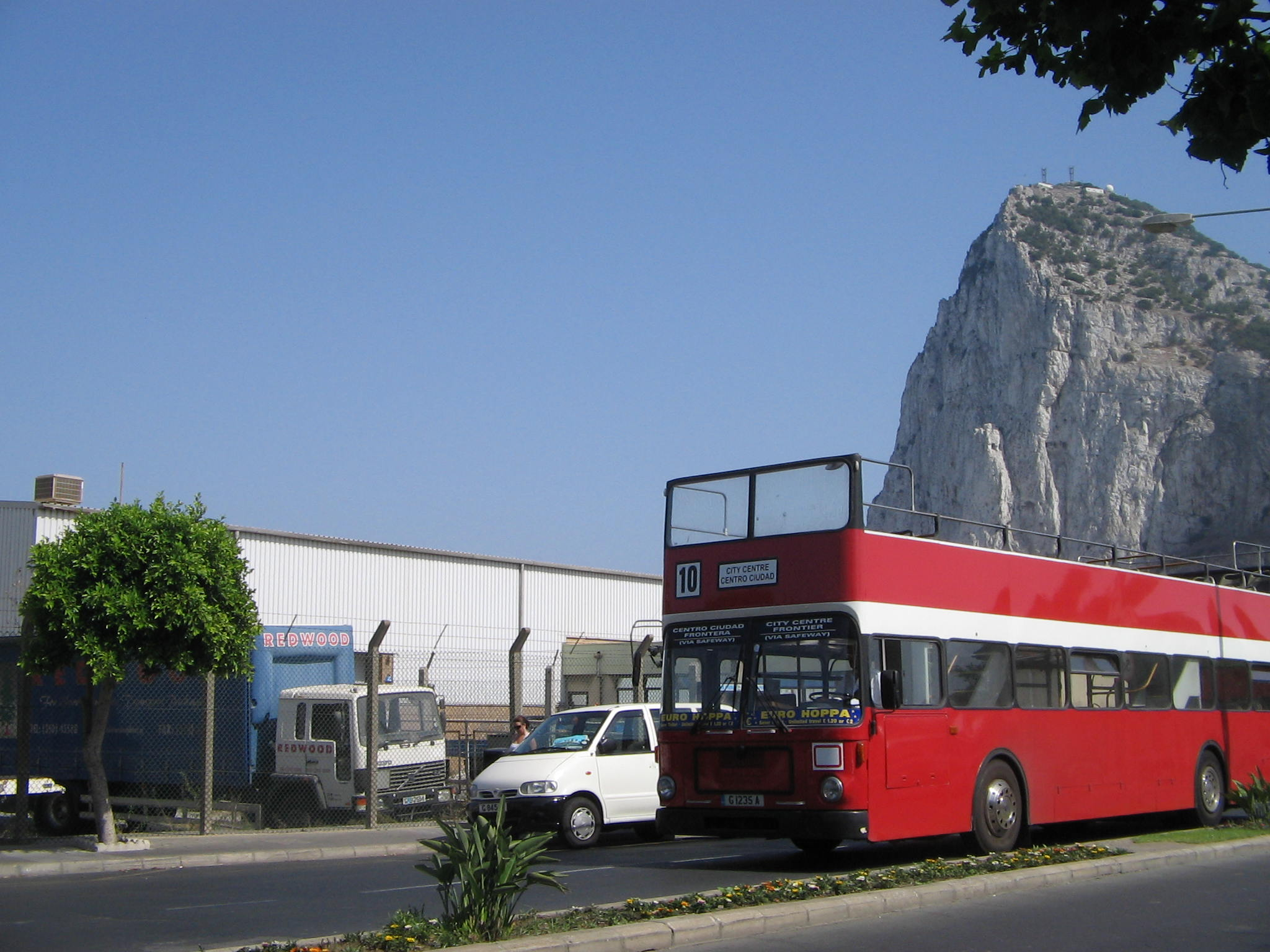
Calypso Transport open top bus on route 10

There are a total of eight different bus routes in Gibraltar. There are two companies that provide stage-carriage bus services in Gibraltar: Gibraltar Bus Company and Calypso Transport.

The Government of Gibraltar owned Gibraltar Bus Company operates routes 1, 2, 3, 7, 8 and 9 with a fleet of 21 buses, 18 of which are Dennis Dart low-floor midibus with Caetano Nimbus bodies and featuring 28 seats and three Mercedes-Benz Sprinter minibuses with Unvi bodies and catering for 15 seated passengers. The Darts entered service the day the company was officially formed, Saturday 10 April 2004, when it took over the operation of private company Rock City Services, who had been unwilling to invest in its fleet. The trio of Sprinters entered service during November 2010 and operate Service 1 to the Moorish Castle Estate in the Upper Town area of the city.

Calypso Transport operates route 5 between the Frontier (the land border with Spain), the airport and the city centre and tickets between this route and those operated by the Gibraltar Bus Company are not inter-changeable. An adult single fare on either operators' services currently costs £1.00 and an all-day Hoppa ticket costs £1.50. A year-long trial period where free travel was permitted aboard the buses of the Gibraltar Bus Company ended in May 2012 and only qualifying residents, commuters and military personnel now qualify for free travel in the territory.

==== Bus Fares - Both Operators' Services ====
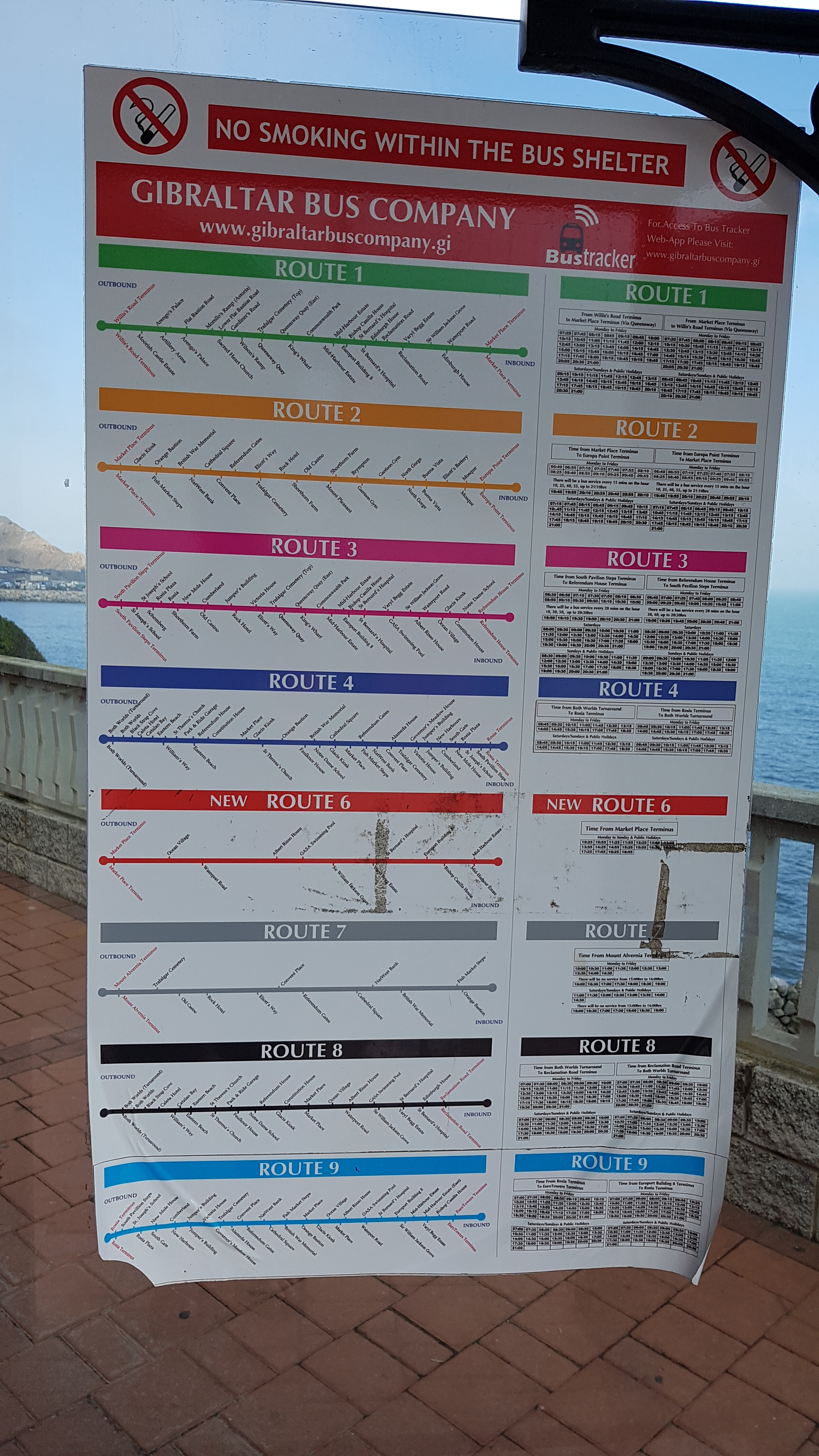
Timetable on a bus shelter

	Single	All Day Pass
Adult	£1.80	£2.50
Pensioner	£1.00	£1.50
Child	£1.50	£2.00

Most Gibraltar Bus Company buses take both cash and card payments, and tickets for both operators can also be purchased online.

Calypso Transport uses a fleet of red double-decker buses.

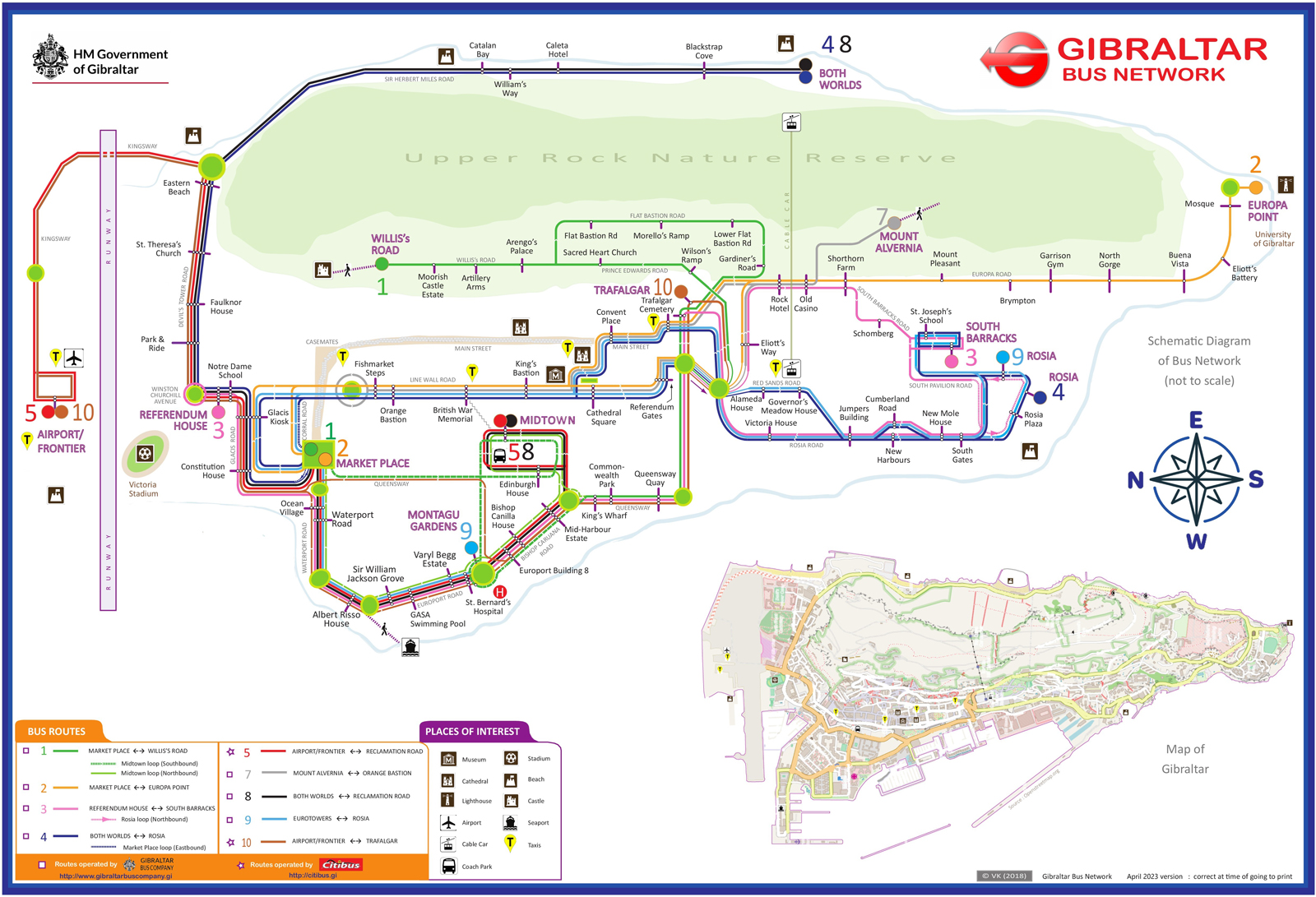
The 2023 Gibraltar bus network map.

Route 5 buses operate every 15 minutes Monday to Saturdays, and every 20 minutes on Sundays, this is a shuttle between Reclamation Road (British Steps) near John Macintosh Square and the Frontier/Airport terminus via the Market Place bus station Grand Casemates Square.

Gibraltar Bus Company increased the bus fares for all routes in Gibraltar in May 2013.

=== Taxis ===
Taxis are available from a number of taxi ranks around the Rock. Many taxis cater specifically for tours of the Upper Rock Nature Reserve, and these can be picked up from the frontier or the city centre; however, taxi drivers are also obliged to take standard fares as well as tours. Almost all taxis are required to be painted white, but as of 2026, 10 black LEVC TX5 cabs were introduced to replace the private hire fleet.. Most taxis take both cash and card payments.

== Rail ==
=== Historical ===
There are no extant railways in Gibraltar. There was formerly an extensive railway within the Gibraltar Dockyard, and neighbouring works and storage facilities. It included tunnels, one of which went through the Rock of Gibraltar, and is still in use today as a road tunnel. At the turn of the 19th and 20th centuries there was also a temporary industrial railway in Gibraltar. At the period when both railways were operational, it was possible to travel right round the entire coastline of Gibraltar by train. The dockyard railway had a roster of 17 locomotives, distinguished by numbers, but four of which also carried names: Gibraltar, Catalan, Rosia, and Calpe.

=== Access to the rail system in Spain ===
Whilst railway track extends to the outskirts of La Linea from the aborted San Roque-La Línea railway line expansion project in the 1970s, the nearest actual railway station (in Spain) is "San Roque - La Línea" station on the ADIF Algeciras-Bobadilla railway. This line takes a route through the mountains via Ronda to access the high-speed line north of Malaga.

As an important port, Algeciras has been promised an improved rail service. In 2021, after details emerged about a possible accession agreement of Gibraltar into the Schengen Area, the Chief Minister Fabian Picardo commented on the potential of rail to develop links to other parts of Europe.

Until 1969, a ferry from Gibraltar provided convenient access to Algeciras station, which along with the railway line to Ronda was built by a British company known as the Algeciras Gibraltar Railway Company.

=== Access to the rail system in Morocco ===
Ferries by FRS running twice a week from Gibraltar to Tanger-Med port provide access to the Moroccan railway system.

== Sea ==
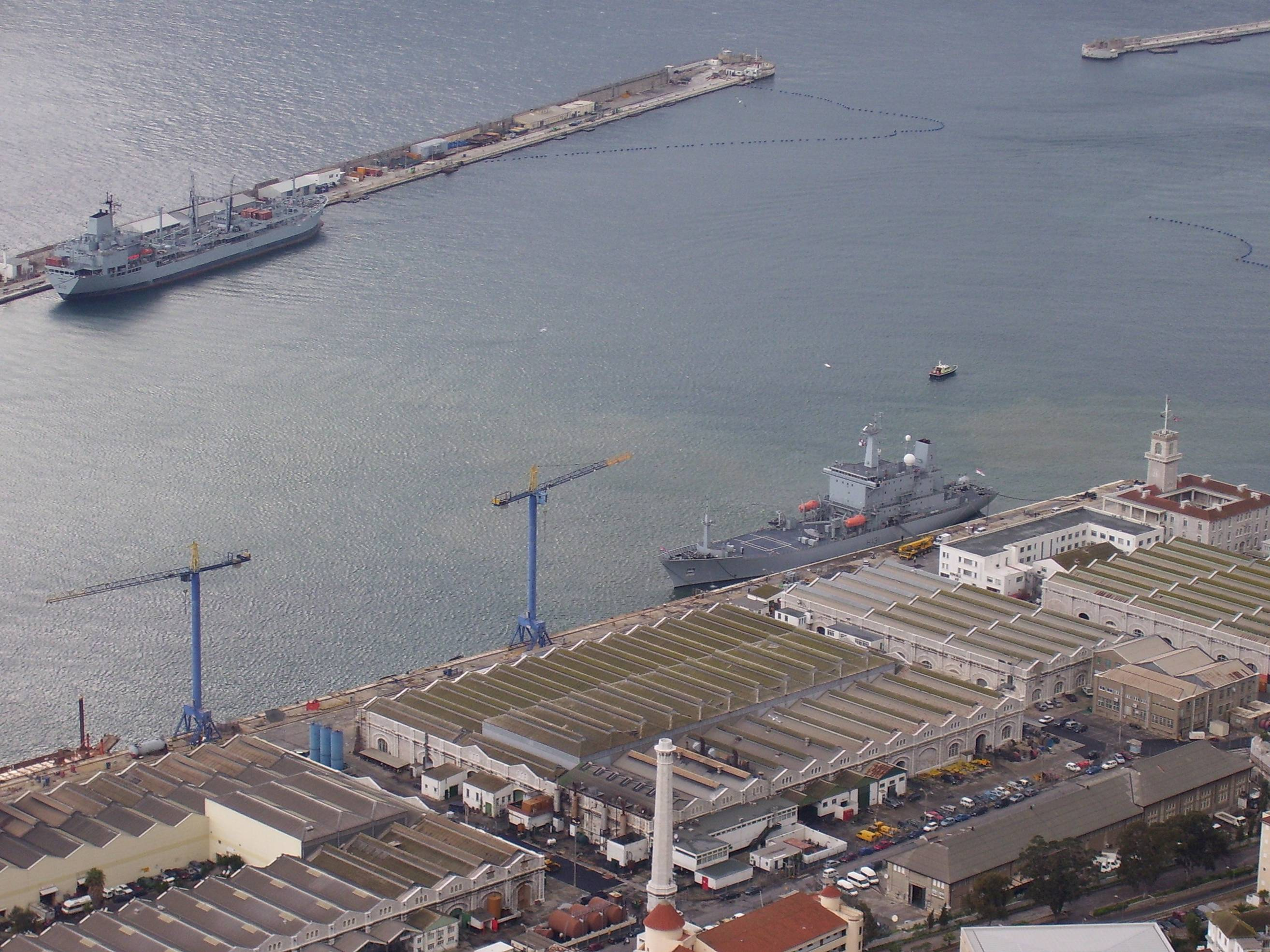
Gibraltar's Royal Navy Base

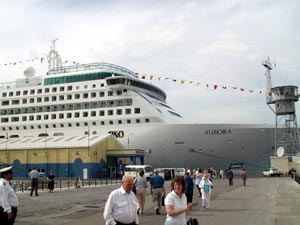
MV Aurora (2000) berthed adjacent to the Gibraltar Cruise Terminal at the Western Arm of the North Mole

Being a peninsula, the sea has long been vital to Gibraltar's transport links. The Royal Navy Dockyard was formerly Gibraltar's major employer.

There is still a harbour on the west side of the territory. The Gibraltar-registered merchant marine consists of 26 ships of 1000 tonnes and above. There is an irregular direct regular fast ferry service to Tanger-Med port, Morocco but many passengers now travel from Algeciras or Tarifa due to a more regular service being present at those ports.

The ferry between Gibraltar and Algeciras, which existed until 1969, when communications with Spain were severed by the Spanish dictator Francisco Franco, was reopened on 16 December 2009, served by the Spanish company Transcoma, which used a catamaran, Punta Europa Segundo in memory of the original ferry that served the cross-Bay route in the 1960s. The maritime operations of Transcoma were taken over by Grupo Medex on 10 November 2010, which announced a higher-capacity new ship for 2011. Freight ferries between Gibraltar and Algeciras for shipments of food goods were started after the UK's withdrawal from the EU.

Various cruise liners visit the Port of Gibraltar throughout the year, and dock at the Gibraltar Cruise Terminal on the Western Arm of the North Mole. This provides the means of transport for a significant proportion of day-tripper tourists arriving in the territory.

== Air ==
During World War I, the Royal Naval Air Service brought one of the first seaplanes to come to Gibraltar, a Wight Seaplane, to search for submarines.

In 1931 the seaplane Saro Windhover Captained by Edgar Percival for GB Airways was the first of regular passenger flights from Gibraltar to Morocco. If there was a levant wind, then the seaplane would land on an aerodrome in Morocco instead of Tangier harbour.

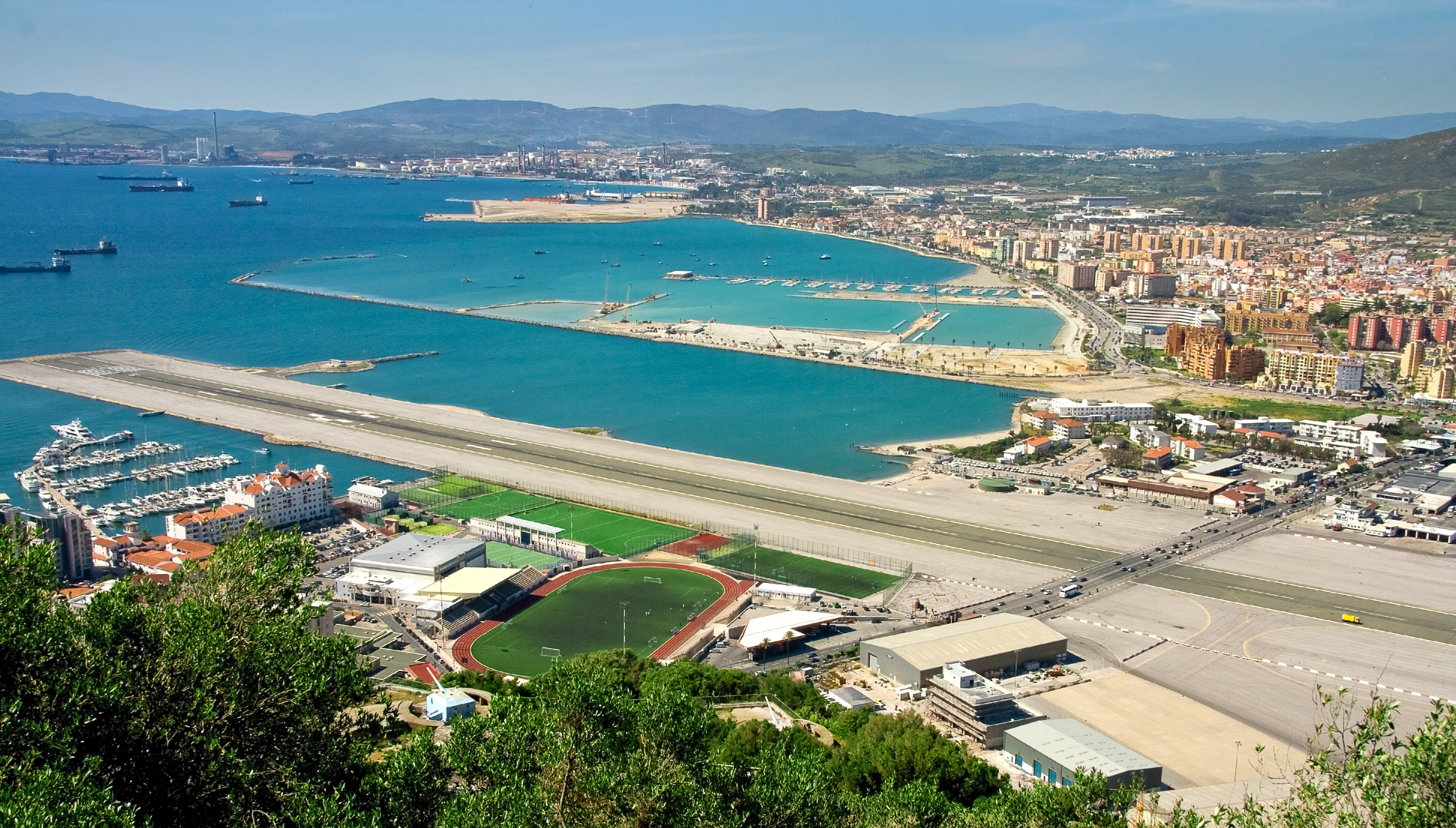
Gibraltar Airport and border area. Showing runway (Gibraltar) and pier behind (Spain). Officially, any exact line is still disputed

Work began in 1939 to build what is today Gibraltar Airport and is the territory's only airport. It is situated very close to the border with Spain. Winston Churchill Avenue, the road which runs from the Gibraltar–Spain border, crosses the runway, requiring the road to be closed each time an aircraft lands or takes off. A bypass tunnel, the Kingsway, opened in March 2023, allowing the runway-crossing road to be closed to vehicles for everyday use, though it remains open to pedestrians. Scheduled civilian passenger flights are operated by EasyJet, British Airways and Royal Air Maroc.

Following an agreement signed in Córdoba between the Governments of the United Kingdom, Spain and Gibraltar in September 2006, the use of Gibraltar Airport by both Gibraltarian and Spanish services was agreed. Gibraltar Airport will be adapted to have an entrance from Spain (as well as Gibraltar), in a similar manner to Basel and Geneva airports (which are also adjacent to borders).

Iberia commenced direct flights between Madrid and Gibraltar on 16 December 2006 with GB Airways following on 1 May 2007. However, GB Airways discontinued its Madrid service on 30 September 2007 and Iberia subsequently considered using smaller aircraft, possibly from its Air Nostrum regional partner – indicating that neither operator may have been able to fill their planes with passengers. Iberia eventually withdrew its service in September 2008. In 2009 Ándalus Líneas Aéreas started flights between Gibraltar and Madrid. However, on 13 August 2010, the airline ceased operations because the Spanish aviation authorities withdrew their licence.

Following the takeover by EasyJet, GB Airways dropped its direct Gibraltar–London Heathrow service on 28 October 2006 despite apparently remaining popular. The reason cited by GB Airways was the "convenience of" concentrating all its London services onto a single hub at Gatwick. Later, a sale of several of GB Airways' Heathrow slots is believed to have netted GB Airways with up to £80m. In late 2007 GB Airways was bought by EasyJet (and thus ceased to be a British Airways franchise partner); all flights were rebranded as EasyJet in 2008.

Flights are available from Gibraltar to London Heathrow, London Gatwick, Luton, Bristol, Casablanca, Tangier and Manchester airports. During 2012 bmibaby offered a service to East Midlands Airport, but the airline ceased operations in September 2012.

== Cable car ==
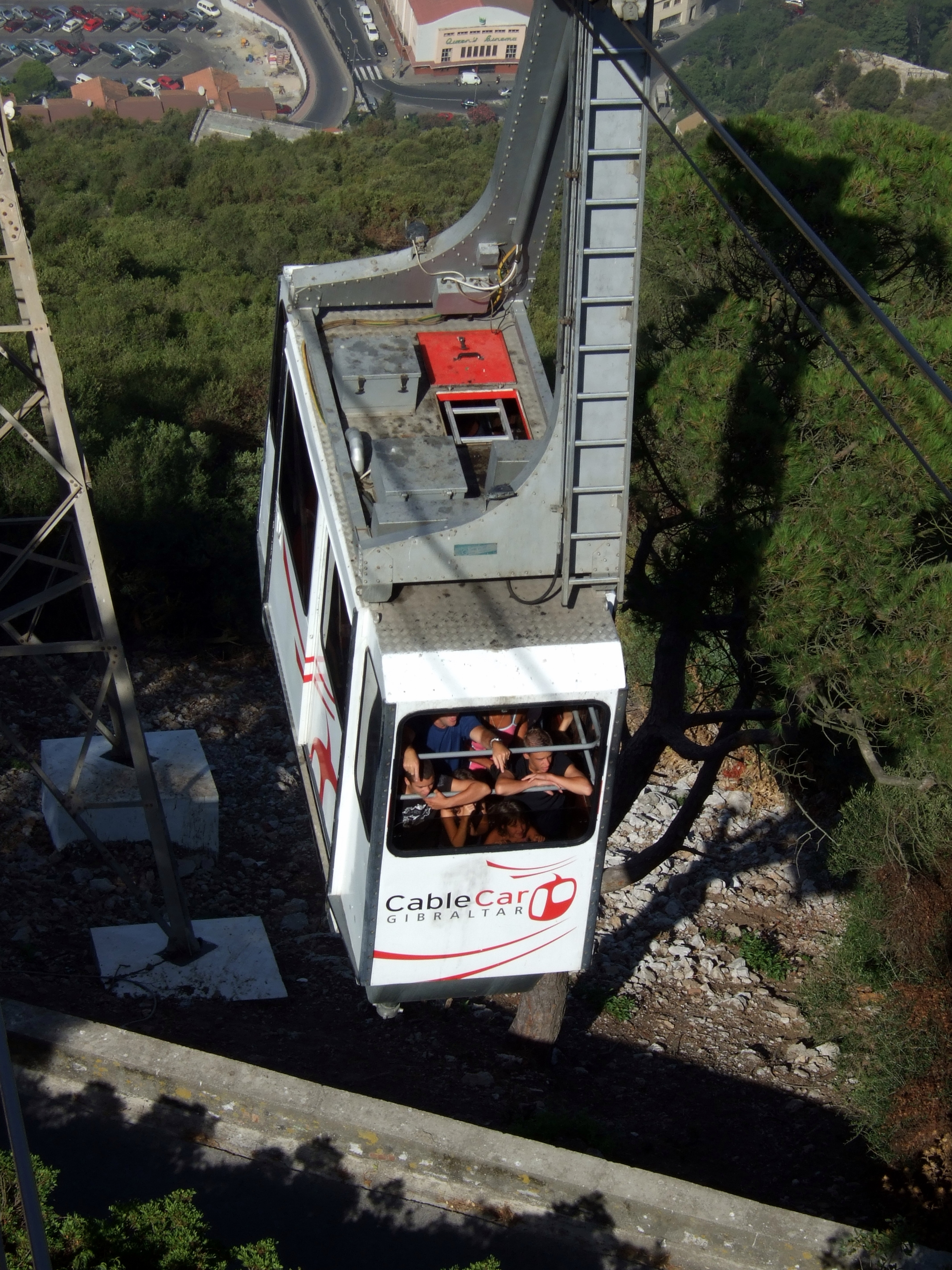
Gibraltar Cable Car

A cable car runs from just south of the city centre to the Ape's Den and the Top of the Rock, which, despite its name, is actually the second highest peak of the Rock.

As of November 2025, the cable car is closed for a major reconstruction expected to last two years.

== Proposed tunnel ==
In January 2021, it was reported that the United Kingdom and Morocco would discuss building a Strait of Gibraltar crossing between Gibraltar and Tangiers.

== Dispute with Spain ==
The road crossing into Spain was closed by the Spanish authorities in 1969 and only reopened for pedestrians in 1982 and for vehicles in 1985.

A ferry operated between Algeciras and Gibraltar until 1969. For a few months in 2004 Spain banned cruise ships which had visited Gibraltar from going to Spanish ports on the same journey. In 2003, the land frontier was closed for a day by Spain on the grounds that a visiting cruise liner, the MV Aurora, was affected by contagious food poisoning. No cases in Gibraltar were reported.

The airport is built on the isthmus which the Spanish Government claim not to have been ceded in the Treaty of Utrecht, thus the integration of Gibraltar Airport in the Single European Sky system has been blocked by Spain. The 1987 agreement for joint control of the airport with Spain was rejected by the then Government of Gibraltar. All successive Governments of Gibraltar have rejected it, although welcoming joint use of the airport (which being next to the border could operate in a similar manner to Geneva Airport or EuroAirport Basel Mulhouse Freiburg). Following the Cordoba Agreement (between the UK, Spain and Gibraltar) in 2006, the joint use of the airport was finally agreed.

The road crossing from Gibraltar into Spain can often be subject to long delays. A loop road is located next to the border to hold cars waiting in the queue to cross into Spain. Motorists (and sometimes pedestrians) crossing the border are randomly subjected to long delays and searches by the Spanish authorities.
