= Hotel Reina Cristina =

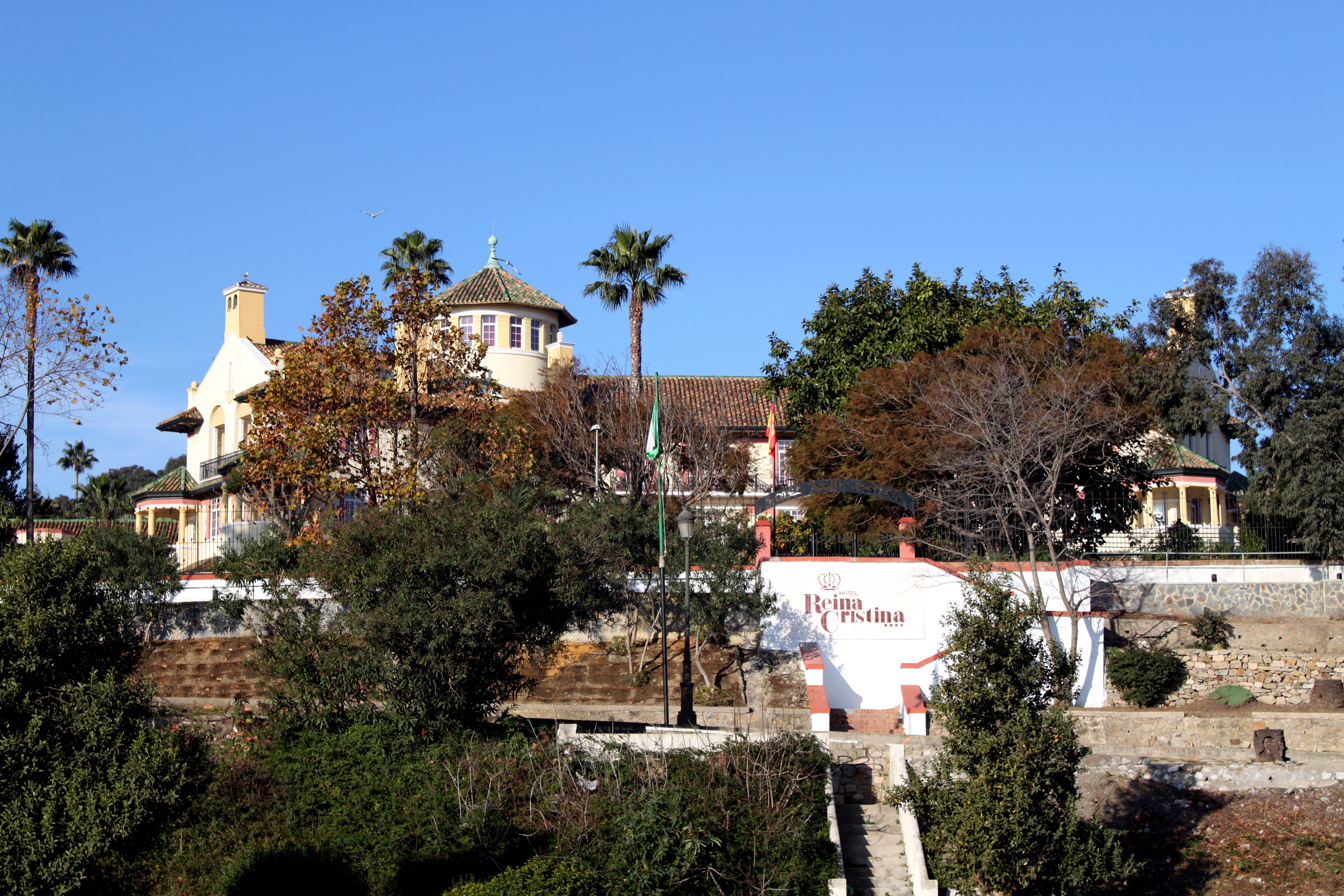
- Hotel Reina Cristina
- Interactive map of the Hotel Reina Cristina area

General information
- Location: Algeciras, Spain
- Coordinates: 36°07′24″N 5°26′40″W
- Opening: 1901

Website
- Official hotel website

Hotel Reina Cristina is an historic hotel in Algeciras, Spain. It was opened in 1901. It is representative of the British colonial architecture imported into the city in the early twentieth century from the nearby British Overseas Territory of Gibraltar.

== History ==
The Hotel was built in the 1890s in response to the housing needs arising from the opening of the Algeciras-Bobadilla railway and opened in 1901. The original colonial English style building was funded by Alexander Henderson, 1st Baron Faringdon, via his company the Algeciras Gibraltar Railway Company. The original hotel (designed by Thomas Edward Collcutt) burned down in 1928 but it was rebuilt with one floor designed by architect Guillermo Thompson. It reopened in April 1932. The new building kept the overall structure of English colonial style and added elements typical of Andalusian architecture as befitted the eclectic movement of the time. The hotel is built around a central courtyard with landscape gardens. This building plays an important part of the history of Algeciras, especially during the Conference of Algeciras in 1906 and during World War II when spies would monitor the military movements in Gibraltar. It has also been visited by many famous people over the years, including Arthur Conan Doyle, Charles de Gaulle, Winston Churchill and Orson Welles.
