= Vehicle registration plates of Gibraltar =

British Overseas Territory of Gibraltar
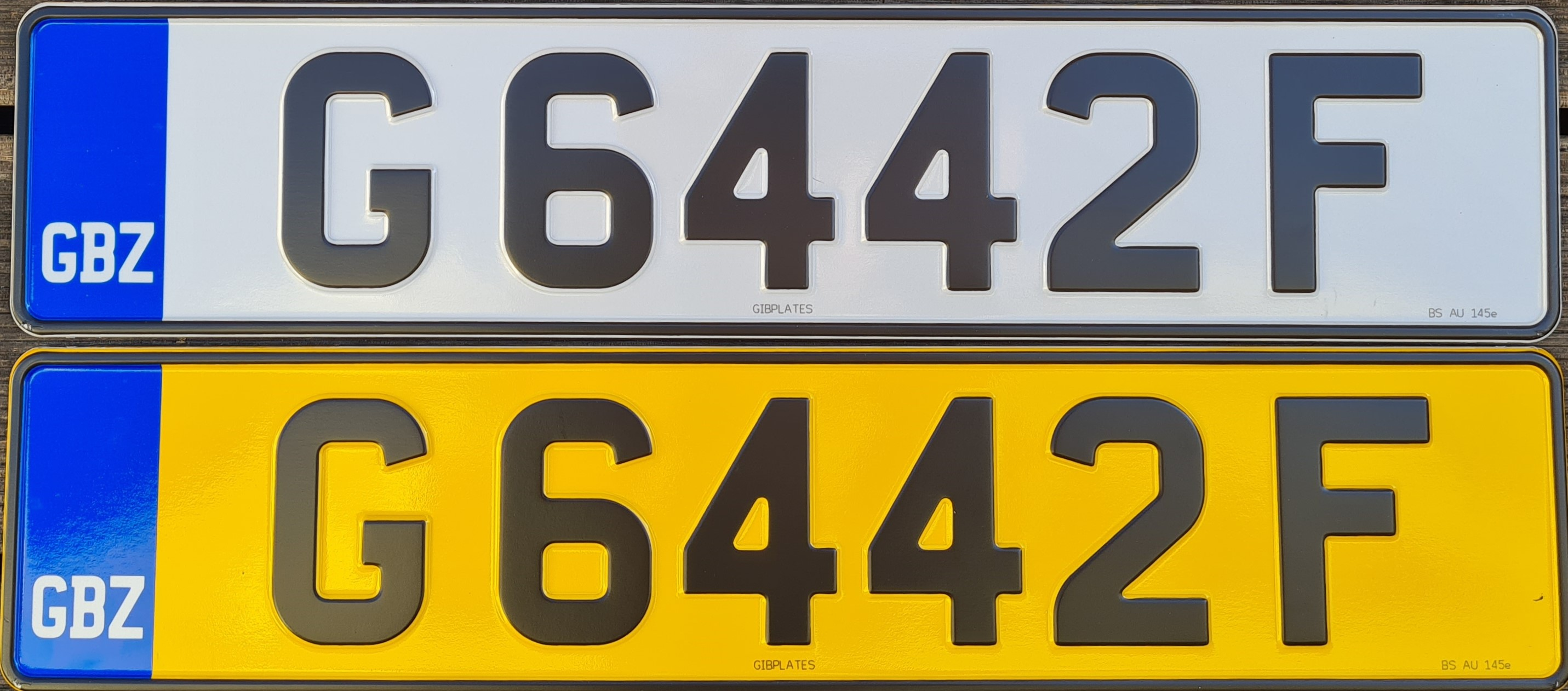
- Gibraltarian regular legal standard number plate.
- Country: Gibraltar
- Country code: GBZ

Current series
- Size: 520 mm × 110 mm 20.5 in × 4.3 in
- Serial format: Not standard
- Colour (front): Black on white
- Colour (rear): Black on yellow

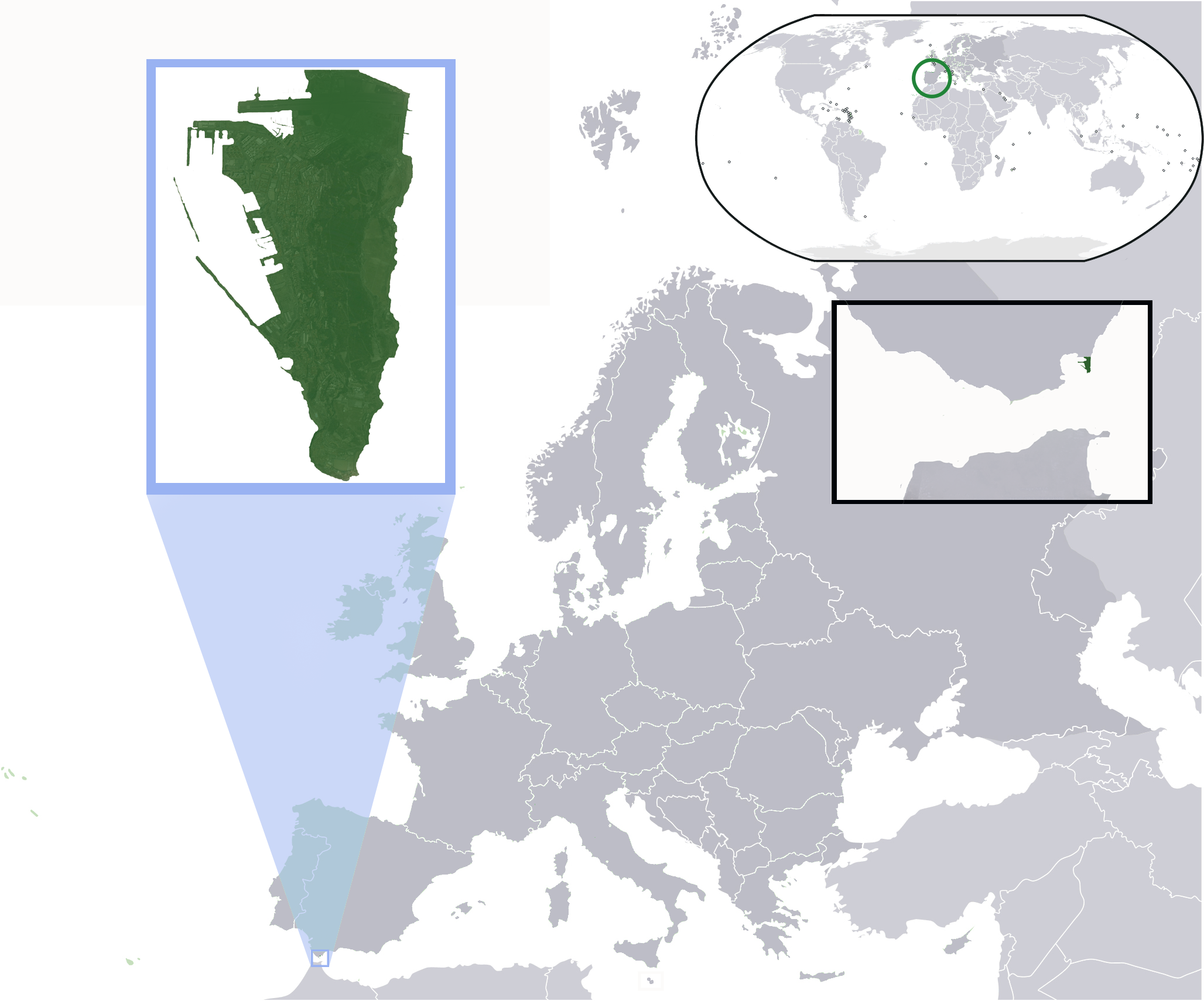
Location of Gibraltar

Vehicle registration plates of Gibraltar are similar to those of the United Kingdom, with the same colours and typeface, similar to the common EU format. Vehicle registration plates, usually called 'number plates', include the international vehicle registration code for Gibraltar, 'GBZ' (Great Britain and Northern Ireland – Z). GBG is used for Guernsey.

== Dimensions ==
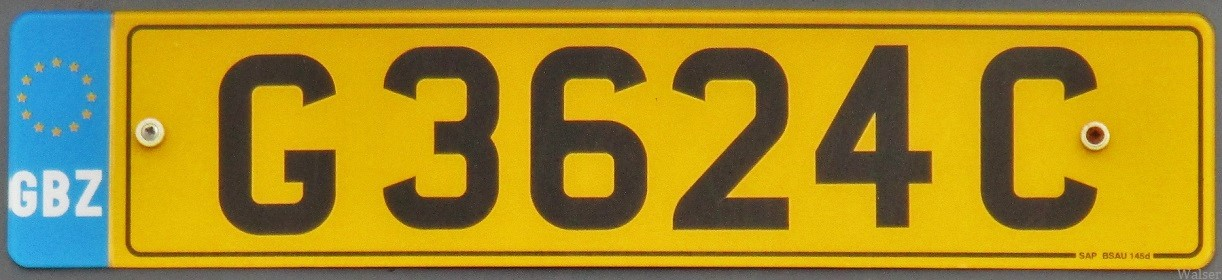
Pre-Brexit Gibraltar rear number plate

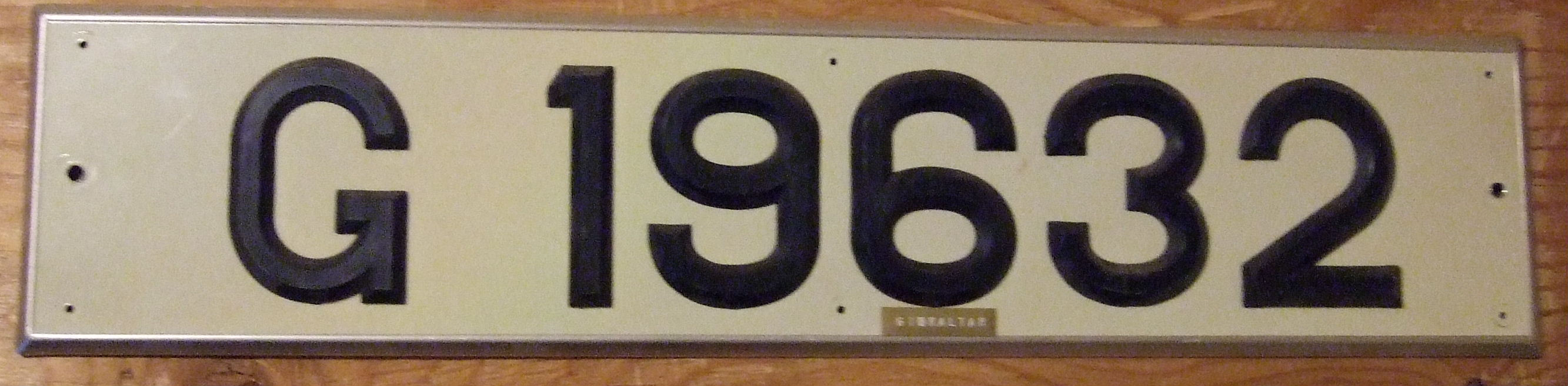
An old Gibraltar front number plate

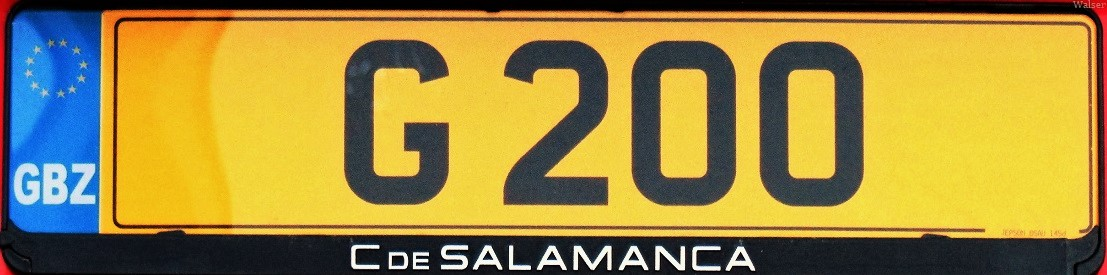
Old number re-issued on EU-plates

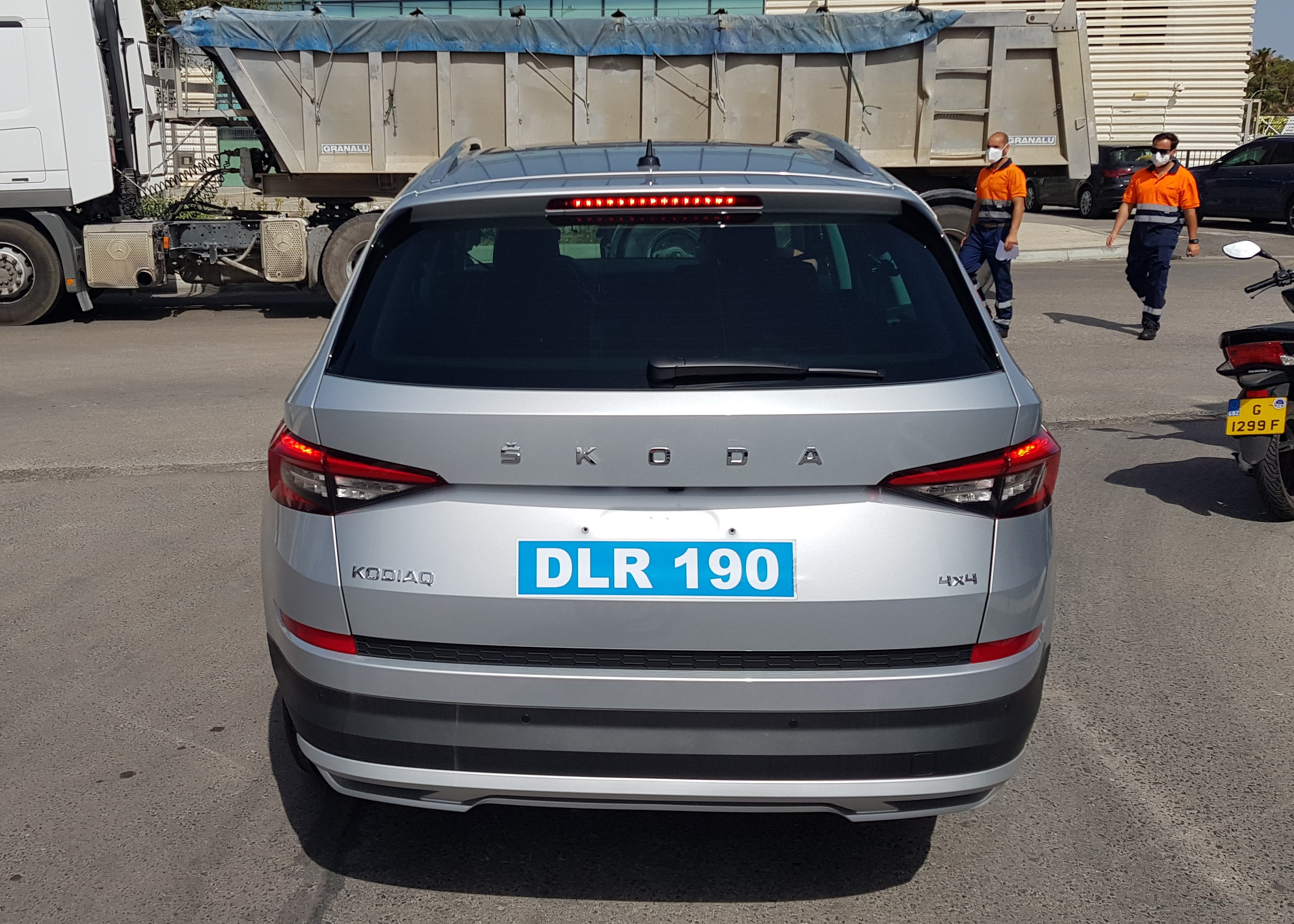
Gibraltar dealer plate seen at GI/ES commercial border crossing

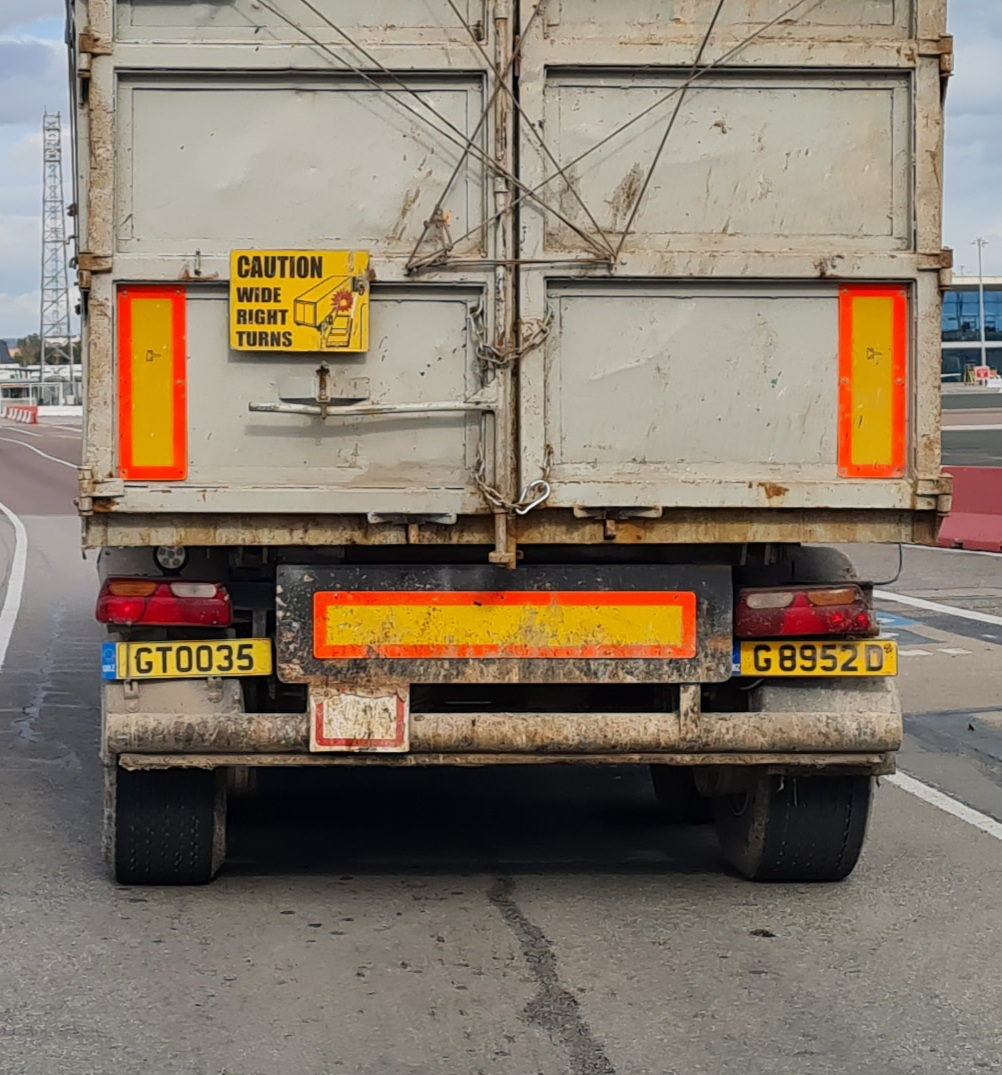
Gibraltar trailer plate

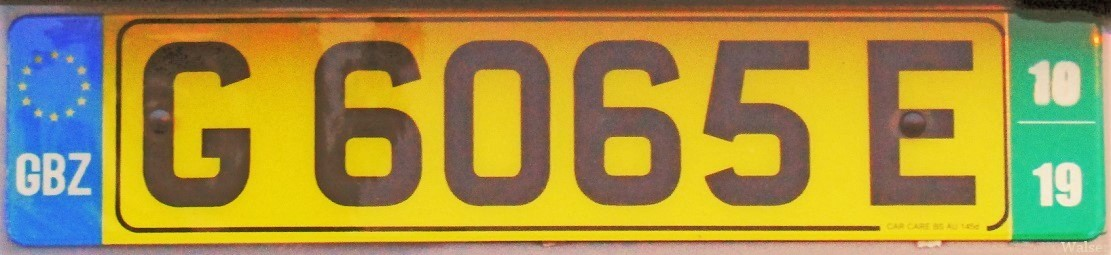
2019 Temporary number plate

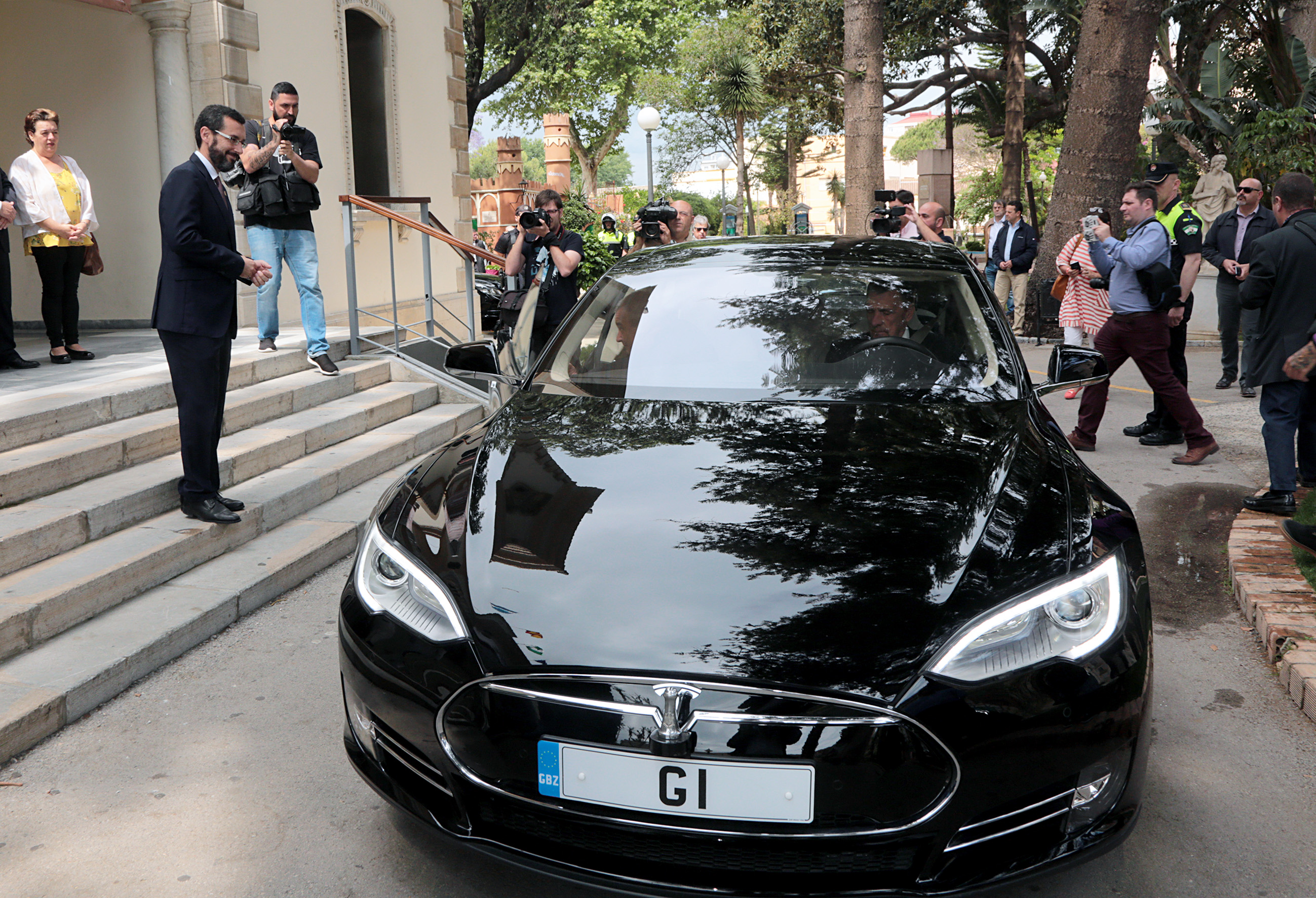
G1, the Chief Minister's official car

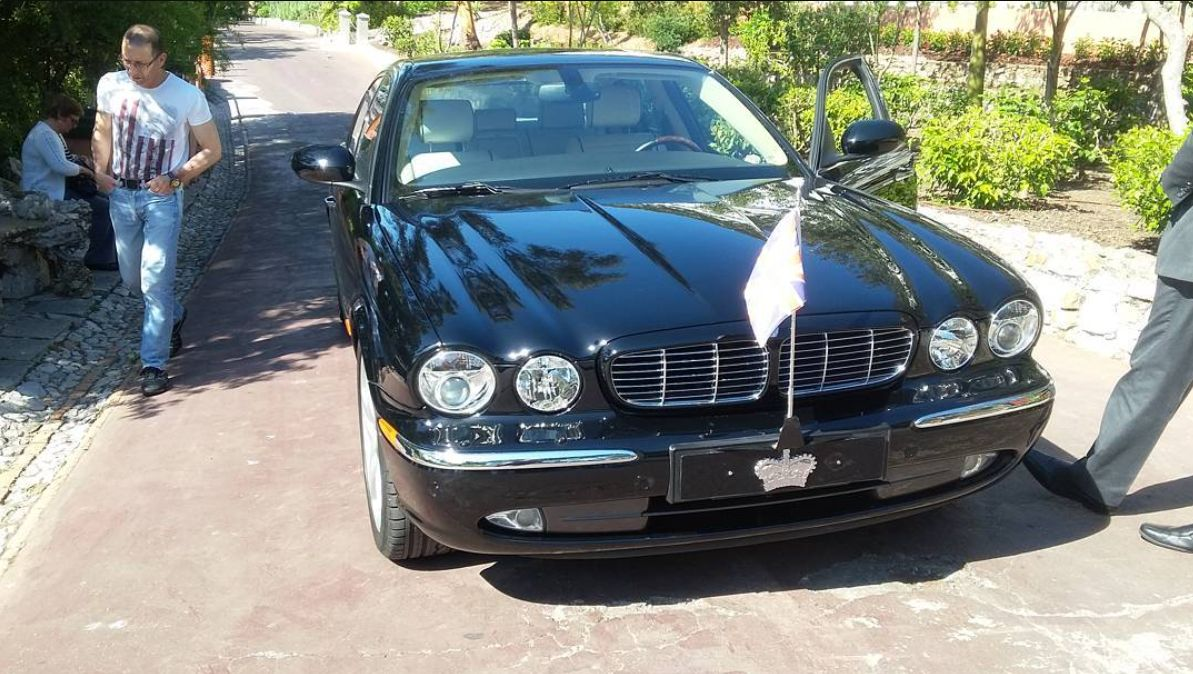
The Governor's car

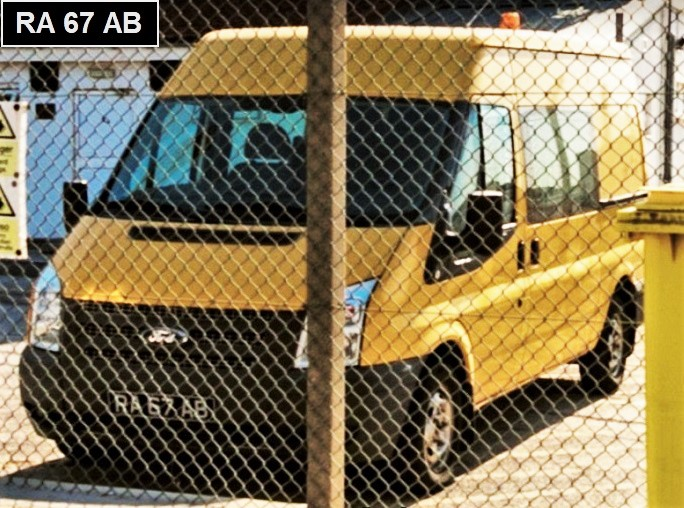
Military vehicle in Gibraltar

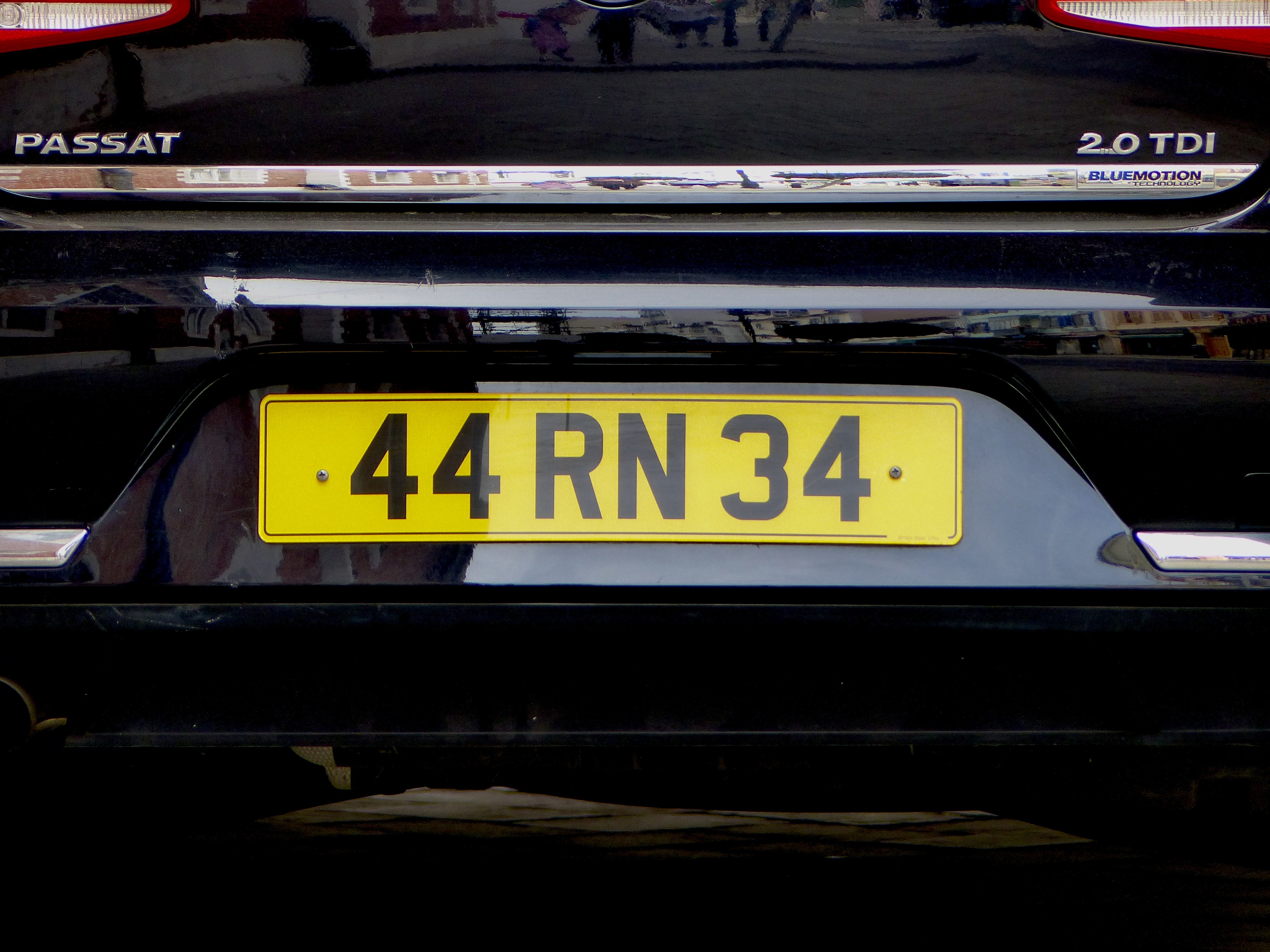
Royal Naval vehicle in Gibraltar

Number plates in Gibraltar have the same measurements as those in the UK:

- Front plates (white) are 520 mm x 111 mm (standard).
- Rear plates (yellow) may be 520 mm x 111 mm (standard) or 285 mm x 203 mm (square).

== Metal pressed number plates ==
Until 2017, Gibraltar's plates were made on a plastic base like British plates. However, as of 2017 Gibraltar has had the choice of bases after a company specialising in metal based plates started. To date, new vehicles still have a choice whether to use plastic plates or metal plates. On average, the ratio to new registrations issued on plastic plates to metal plates is 1:1.

== Privately owned vehicles ==
From 1912 to 2001 Gibraltar number plates consisted of the letter 'G' (for Gibraltar) followed by a series of digits issued in numerical order. The maximum number of digits was five, so the first registration plate should have been G 1 - in fact the first plate was GBZ 1 - and the last was G 99999.

A new system was introduced in October 2001, in anticipation of running out of registration numbers once reaching G 99999. The new system consists of the letter 'G' followed by four digits from 1000 to 9999 and another letter. The last letter represents the series. For example, series A consists of all registration plates from G 1000 A to G 9999 A. The next series is B, and so on. Currently, as of July 2024 registration plates in Gibraltar are in series G.

The European flag was also featured, along with Gibraltar's international vehicle registration GBZ until Brexit The two registration formats resemble those used in Spain between 1900 and 1971, and 1971 and 2000. However the single letter G was never issued as a provincial designator on Spanish plates.

As of January 2021, Gibraltar plates are issued with a blue band and "GBZ" as the country identifier, however the European stars have been removed. There were a few public surveys which had a different overall outcome (a Gibraltar flag replacing the Euro stars), however the government decided to opt for a plain blue band. The main reason behind this was to prevent any incidents in Spain due to the Gibraltar flag potentially causing a minor provocation.

- Registrations can be re-issued.

== Special number plates ==
Trailer plates are similar to the regular issues. However, they feature "GT" instead of "G" as the prefix before the registration code. Trailer plates have become compulsory in Gibraltar for all trailers registered after 2016.

GT 1234

Temporary/export plates are similar to, and in the same series as, the regular issues. However at the right hand side of the plate is a green band, showing month and year of expiry. Until 2001 temporary tourist (duty-free) plates had registrations from the normal series except that the prefix used was GG. This series reached past GG90000, and was probably superseded by the dated green band style when the suffix letter was introduced.

GG 12345

G 1234 A

British military vehicles in Gibraltar display regular UK military plates. Most military vehicles in Gibraltar use the letters 'RN' (reserved for Royal Navy vehicles), although some use other letters indicating that they are of the British Army or the Royal Air Force. UK military vehicles do not carry national identity ovals, but sometimes display a small Union Flag.

RA 12 AB

RN 12 AB

Dealer plates are light blue with the letters DLR and a serial number in white. These are usually magnetic plates, but also can be simply written on paper or cardboard etc.

DLR 123

The Chief Minister's official car has the registration number G 1.

G 1

The Governor's official car, following tradition, displays a silver crown, in place of a registration plate with a number.

== See also ==
- Vehicle registration plates of the United Kingdom
- Vehicle registration plates of Europe
- Transport in Gibraltar
