= Algeciras railway station =

Railway station in Algeciras, Spain

Algeciras
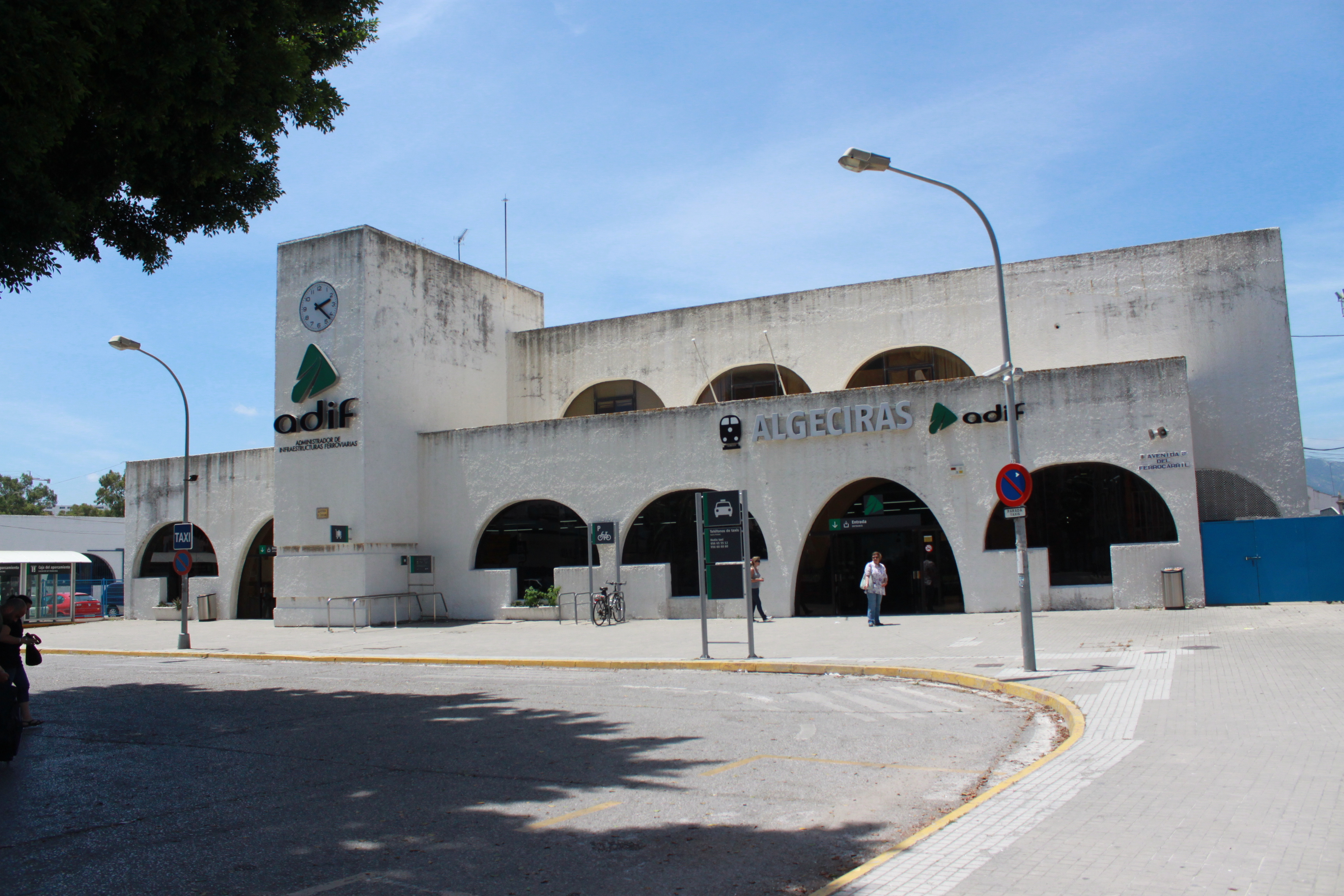

General information
- Coordinates: 36.1264°N 5.4490°W
- Owner: adif
- Line: Algeciras-Bobadilla railway

History
- Opened: 1890

Passengers
- 2024: 132,688
Location

Algeciras railway station is the southernmost rail station on the Spanish rail network and on the European mainland, and serves the town of Algeciras, Andalusia.

== Information ==
Algeciras station is located at the end of the Algeciras-Bobadilla railway. It is served by Renfe Media Distancia and Altaria train services to Granada, Córdoba and Madrid. The line is being upgraded by Adif at a cost of €13.5 million.

== Services ==
Preceding station	Renfe Operadora	Following station
San Roque towards Madrid Puerta de Atocha	Intercity	Terminus
San Roque towards Granada	Media Distancia	Terminus
