= Algeciras Gibraltar Railway Company =

Railway in southern Spain

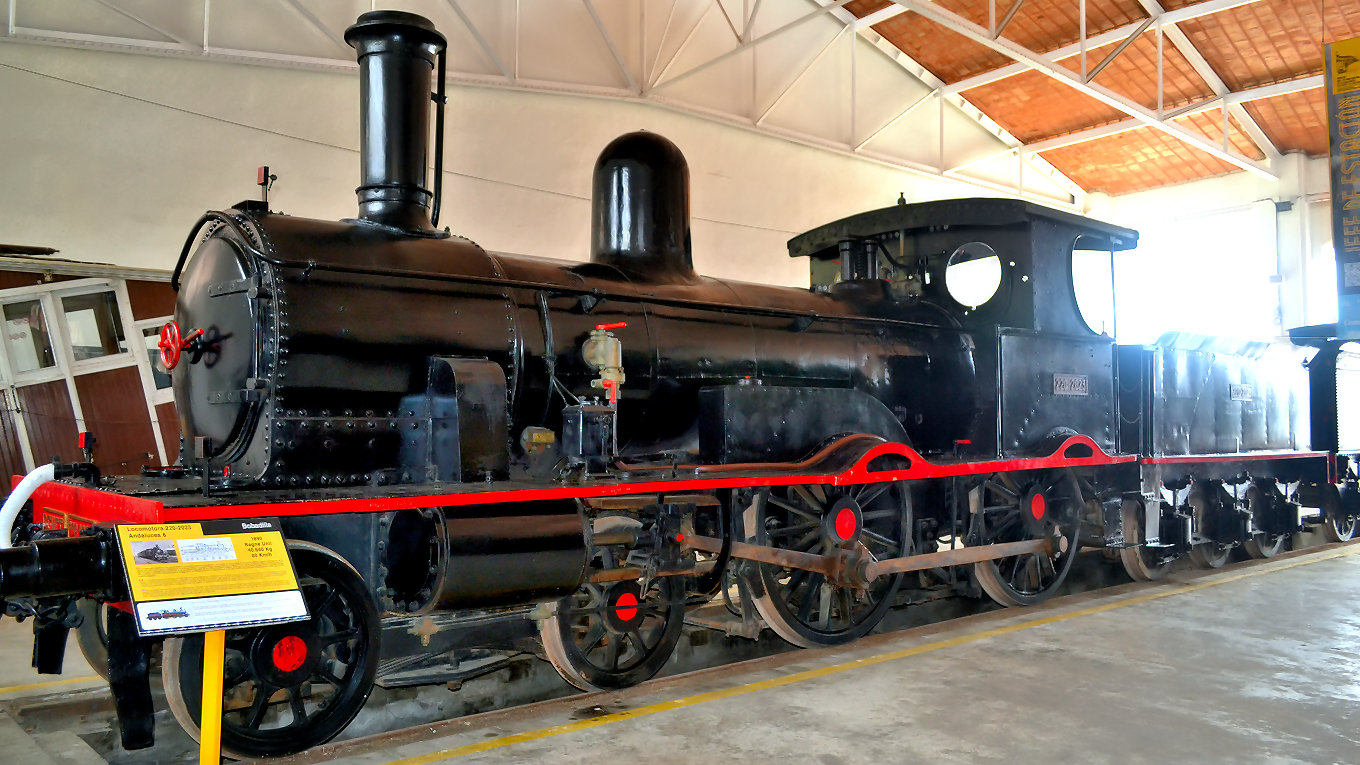
- Former locomotive No. 6 of the Algeciras-Gibraltar Railway Co., preserved in the Railway Museum of Catalonia
- Industry: Rail transport
- Founded: 1889
- Headquarters: London, England
- Key people: Captain Louis Lombard; Alexander Henderson; John Morrison (Scottish Engineer); Joseph White-Todd; Emilio Castelar
- Products: Rail transport, Freight

The Algeciras Gibraltar Railway Company was formed by British businessmen to build the Algeciras-Bobadilla railway line between Algeciras and Bobadilla, Antequera; the first section of track was laid on 1 September 1888. The first train was purchased from Beyer, Peacock & Company in Manchester. A first class return ticket from Gibraltar to Ronda was set at 17.10 pesetas.

== History ==
The railway was built for the benefit of British officers stationed in Gibraltar wanting to travel to Spain and the rest of Europe. To avoid offending Spanish sensitivities, the line was built concluding in Algeciras, a town in Spain on the opposite side of the Bay of Gibraltar, rather than at the Gibraltar border. Despite it having no direct connection to the European railway network at the time, a chapter was devoted to Gibraltar in the 1913 guidebook.

Hotels were also built by the company along the route, such as the Hotel Reina Cristina in Algeciras and the Hotel Reina Victoria in Ronda both designed by Thomas Edward Collcutt.

So impressed were the inhabitants of Algeciras that they named two streets after John Morrison (Scottish Engineer who worked on the project), "Juan Morrison" as he was known locally in Algeciras and "Alexander Henderson, who funded the project".

A 9 km extension from San Roque station to La Línea de la Concepción was laid in 1893 which was to form the San Roque-La Línea railway line, but this was stopped by the Spanish government. The tracks were eventually completed in the 1970s but no train has ever run on them.

== See also ==
- Rail transport in Gibraltar
