= Córdoba–Málaga railway =

Iberian-gauge railway line in Spain

Overview
- Status: Operational
- Owner: Adif
- Termini: Córdoba; Málaga María Zambrano

Service
- Operator(s): Renfe Operadora

History
- Opened: 1865

Technical
- Track gauge: 1,668 mm (5 ft 5 21/32 in) Iberian gauge

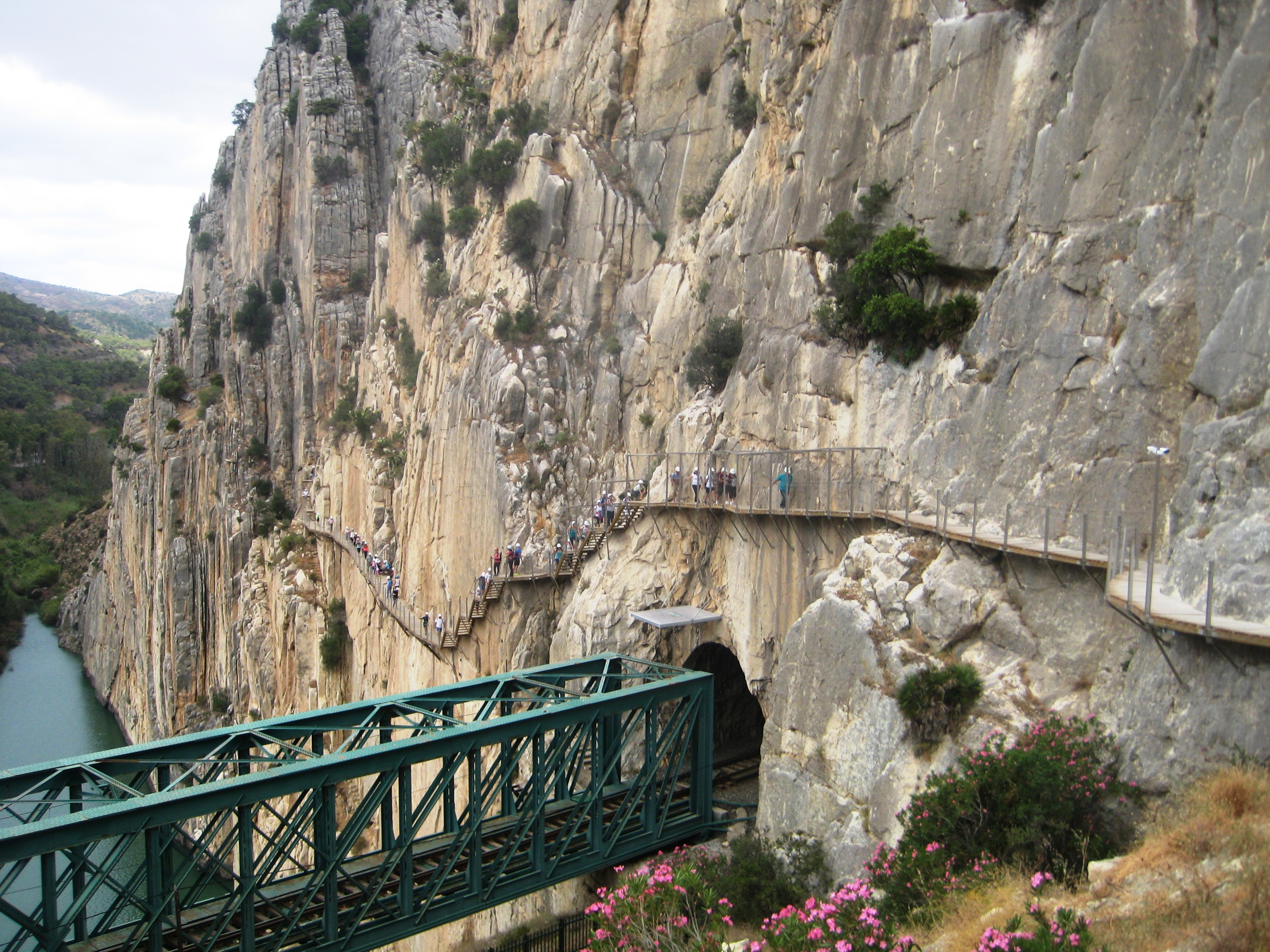

The Córdoba–Málaga railway is an Iberian-gauge railway line in Spain. It branches from the Alcázar de San Juan–Cádiz railway at Córdoba and terminates at Málaga María Zambrano. It was once the only line linking Madrid to Málaga, but now primarily serves local commuter rail services and regional traffic since the opening of the Madrid–Málaga high-speed rail line in 2013.

== Services ==
The line is used by Cercanías Málaga's C-2 service as far as Álora, and regional services from Málaga to Ronda via Bobadilla. Since 2013, due to the opening of the AVE high-speed rail line in 2007, the section between Córdoba and Bobadilla closed to passenger service and is used only by freight trains.
