= Algeciras-Bobadilla railway =

Railway line in Spain

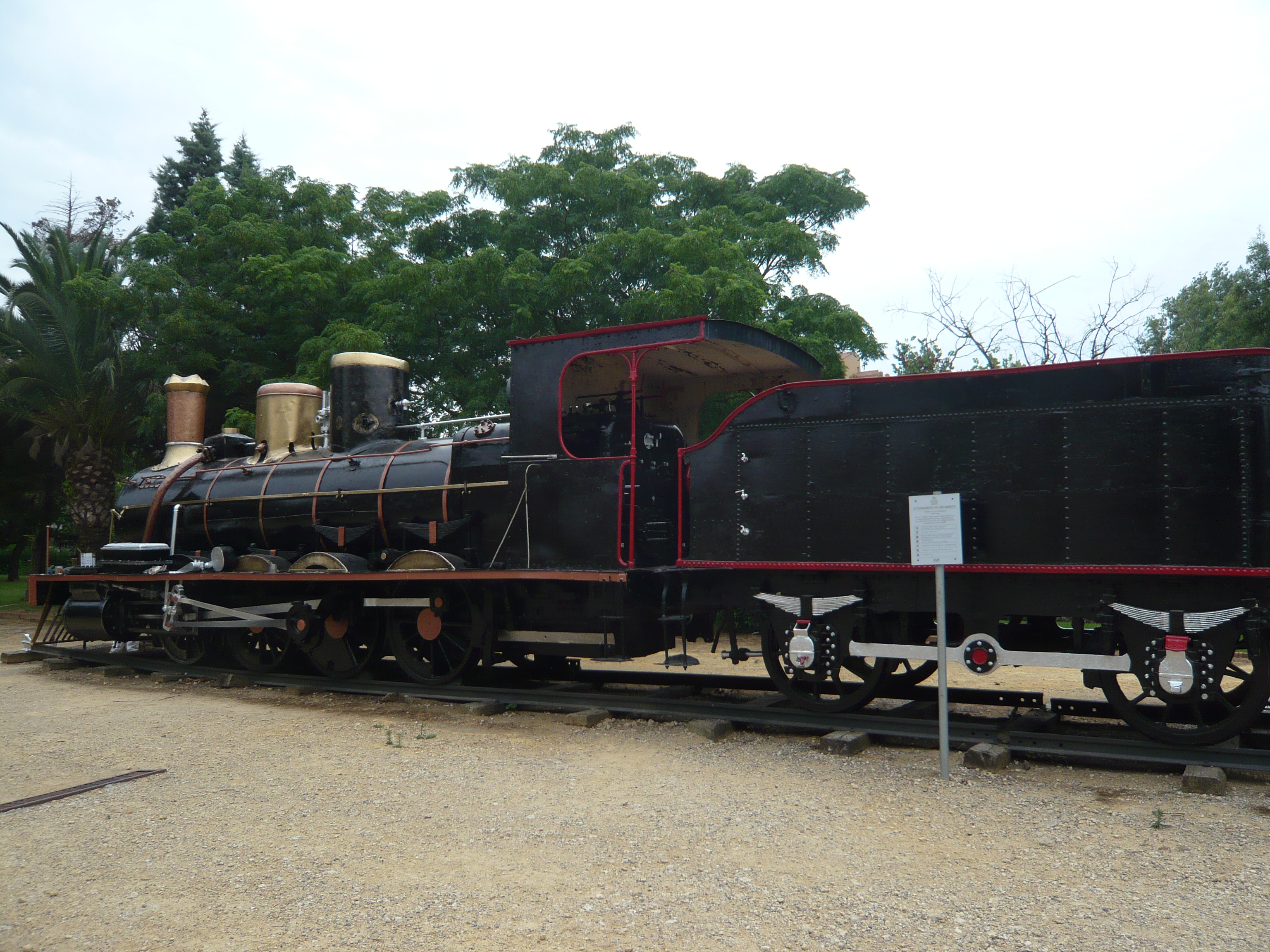
- Steam Engine in Los Barrios manufactured by Beyer, Peacock & Company

Overview
- Status: Operational
- Owner: ADIF
- Locale: Algeciras, Spain
- Termini: Algeciras; Bobadilla

Service
- System: ADIF
- Operator(s): ADIF

History
- Opened: 1888-1892

Technical
- Line length: 188 km (117 mi)

The Algeciras-Bobadilla railway was built by the Algeciras Gibraltar Railway Company, the first section of track was laid on 1 September 1888. The first locomotive was built by Beyer, Peacock & Company in Manchester, England. A 1st class return ticket from Gibraltar to Ronda was set at 17.10 Pesetas.

== History ==
The Algeciras-Bobadilla railway was built for the benefit of British officers stationed in Gibraltar wanting to travel to Spain and the rest of Europe. To avoid offending Spanish sensitivities, the line was built concluding in Algeciras, a town in Spain on the opposite side of the Bay of Gibraltar, rather than at the Gibraltar border. Despite it having no direct connection to the European railway network at the time, a chapter was devoted to Gibraltar in the 1913 edition of the Continental Bradshaw.

So impressed were the inhabitants of Algeciras that they named two streets after people related to the project: one after John Morrison a Scottish engineer ("Juan Morrison"), and one after Alexander Henderson, who had funded the project.

== Current situation ==
The Spanish government is looking to build a high-speed line to Algeciras as part of its Mediterranean Corridor infrastructure. More than one route is possible, and the outcome of the discussions is one of the factors influencing the future of the Bobadilla-Algeciras line.

When Michael Portillo was filming for his 2013 series of Great Continental Railway Journeys, the Bobadilla-Algeciras line was under threat. However, in 2019 the Spanish government progressed plans to renovate the ageing infrastructure of the line at an estimated cost of €159 million.

== See also ==
- Algeciras railway station
- Bobadilla railway station
- Rail transport in Gibraltar
