= San Roque–La Línea railway =

Coordinates: 36.175256°N 5.359137°W

End of the railway in the outskirts of La Línea

The San Roque-La Línea railway line is a railway line built by the Algeciras Gibraltar Railway Company, it connects La Línea de la Concepción to San Roque station, but that has never been used.

== History ==
A 9 km extension from San Roque station to La Línea de la Concepción was laid in 1893 which was to form the San Roque–La Línea railway line, but this was stopped by the Spanish government, the line eventually being completed in the 1970s but no train has ever run on them.

In 2016 a plan was made to use trams on the rail lines already in place since 1970 using EU funds.

In 2021, after details emerged about a possible accession agreement of Gibraltar into the Schengen Area, the Gibraltar Chief Minister Fabian Picardo commented on the potential of railway development upwards towards Europe.
