= Mediterranean Corridor =

Corridor of infrastructure links in Southern and Central Europe

Route information
- Length: 3,000 km (1,900 mi)

Major junctions
- Start end: (Spain) Algeciras
- End end: (Hungary) Záhony

Location
- Countries: Spain; France; Italy; Slovenia; Croatia; Hungary

Highway system
- International E-road network; A Class; B Class

The Mediterranean Corridor is number 3 of the nine priority axes of the Trans-European Transport Network (TEN-T).

== Description ==
The Mediterranean Corridor crosses six EU countries (Spain, France, Italy, Slovenia, Croatia and Hungary), over more than 6.000 km along the route: Almeria-Valencia/Madrid-Zaragoza/Barcelona-Marseille-Lyon-Turin-Milan-Verona-Padua/Venice-Trieste/Koper-Ljubljana-Budapest-Záhony. It mainly serves the Golden Banana.

=== Main branches ===
The five main branches of the Mediterranean Corridor are:

- Algeciras-Bobadilla-Madrid-Zaragoza-Tarragona
- Seville-Bobadilla-Murcia
- Cartagena-Murcia-Valencia-Tarragona
- Tarragona-Barcelona-Perpignan-Marseille/Lyon-Turin-Novara-Milan-Verona-Padua-Venice-Ravenna/Trieste/Koper-Ljubljana-Budapest
- Ljubljana/Rijeka-Zagreb-Budapest
