= Bobadilla, Antequera =

Bobadilla
- Village
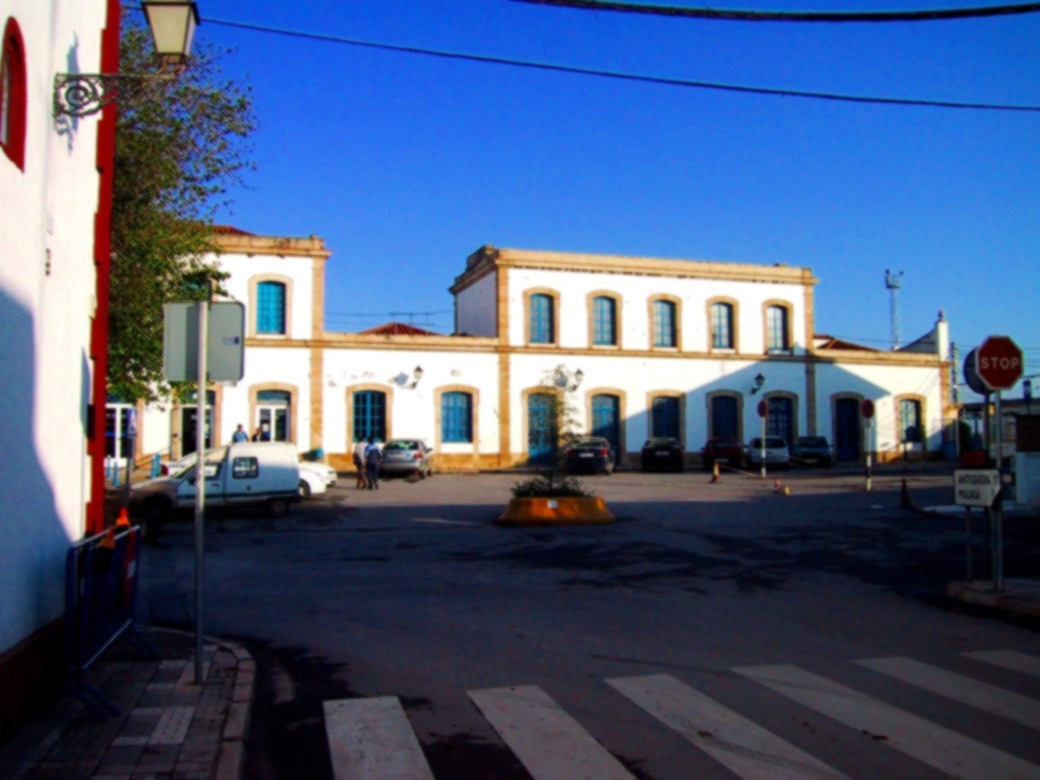
- Bobadilla station building

- Location within Province of Málaga Location within Andalusia Location within Spain
- Coordinates: 37°2′30″N 4°41′46″W
- Country: Spain
- Community: Andalusia
- Province: Málaga
- Comarca: Antequera
- Municipality: Antequera
- Elevation: 500 m (1,600 ft)

Population (2009)
  - Total: 480
- Time zone: UTC+1 (CET)
  - Summer (DST): UTC+2 (CEST)
- Postal code: 29540
- Area code: (+34) ...

Bobadilla, also known as Bobadilla Pueblo ("Bobadilla Village"), is a Spanish village in the municipality of Antequera, in the province of Málaga, Andalusia. It is located in the west of the Antequerano municipal territory, 3 km from Bobadilla railway station.

== History ==
The village was an independent municipality of Salvadorean settlers until 1857, when it was annexed to Antequera.

On 30 March 1950, a mail train from Madrid to Málaga derailed on a set of points in Bobadilla station, killing 8 people and injuring 30.

== Geography ==
Bobadilla itself is a small village of white houses surrounded by olive groves, that lies 13 km west of Antequera and 10 km south of Humilladero. The nearby settlement that grew around the station is named Bobadilla Estación.

== Culture ==
The village's festival is celebrated in the month of August. The romería pilgrimage from 14 to 16 of May.

== Transport ==
Bobadilla railway station is a main railway junction within Antequera municipal territory, and one of the most important in Andalusia for both passengers and goods.
