= Le Train =

French railway company

- Le Train's proposed network map.

Overview
- Fleet: 10 (expected)
- Key people: Alain Getraud (CEO)
- Founders: Alain Getraud
- Dates of operation: 2028 (expected)–

Other
- Website: www.letrainvoyage.fr (in French)

Le Train ([lə tʁɛ̃]) is a French private railway company; it is the first private high-speed operator in France to hold an operating licence.

The company was founded in 2020 with the ambition to operate the first private high-speed rail service in France. In December 2022, Le Train received its operating license, and in January 2023 signed a €300m contract with Spanish train manufacturer Talgo to deliver 10 AVRIL single-deck high-speed trains. Le Train is expected to launch operations in 2028.

Le Train was created with the objective of providing interregional high-speed services across the western regions of the country. These connections will include cities like Bordeaux, Tours, Nantes, and Rennes. The company has partnered with the Spanish manufacturer Talgo to supply its fleet of trains.

In 2026, Le Train expanded its planned network to include high-speed services between Paris and Bordeaux, and between Paris and Rennes. The company signed two framework capacity agreements with SNCF Réseau covering these routes.

In addition to its planned high-speed rail services, Le Train has also participated in competitive tenders for publicly contracted passenger rail services in France, including regional TER and TET-Intercités services.

== History ==
Founded in 2020, Le Train was created by a group of entrepreneurs, including Alain Getraud, a former SNCF executive. The company was established to address a gap in high-speed rail services for the western regions of France. Le Train aims to offer a faster, more efficient travel option for underserved areas, complementing the national service provided by SNCF.

During April 2021, Le Train announced plans to run open-access TGV services using 10 TGV trains. The company did not specify where it would be sourcing TGV rolling stock from and, whilst SNCF was at the time withdrawing TGV Atlantique trains and had plans to withdraw TGV Réseau trains as well as several TGV Sud Est trains in storage awaiting scrappage, it was reported that SNCF had never sold TGV rolling stock on the second-hand market and had traditionally opted to scrap its withdrawn train sets instead.

Le Train plans to operate high-speed routes connecting Bordeaux with Nantes and Bordeaux with Rennes. The Bordeaux-Nantes route will feature five round trips per day, while the Bordeaux-Rennes route will have four round trips daily. These services will include extensions to Bordeaux-Mérignac Airport and Arcachon, with intermediate stops at cities such as La Rochelle and Vannes, enhancing accessibility across the region.

The company launched a Europe-wide competitive tender process to procure the sought rolling stock in early 2022. On 24 December 2022, Le Train received its operating licence (JORF no. 0298), making it the first private high-speed operator in France to hold a licence.

In March 2022, Le Train awarded Talgo, a Spanish train manufacturer, the future contract to supply the company with its new AVRIL high-speed trains.

On 23 January 2023, Le Train announced it had signed a contract with the Spanish train manufacturer Talgo for an order of 10 high-speed trains based on the Talgo AVRIL platform, which once services commence would make it the second operator to operate the type after Spain's Renfe. This contract, valued at €300m, also covers 30 years of maintenance and spare parts as well as a joint R&D unit in Nouvelle-Aquitaine, France. Le Train cited the AVRIL's level-floor accessibility, low-energy usage and dedicated spaces for bicycles and other equipment as factors in its decision to select Talgo as the winning bidder.

Le Train also announced services would run on the high-speed LGV Sud Europe Atlantique between Bordeaux and Tours, as opposed to Bordeaux and Poitiers as initially planned. The company said it had managed to negotiate lower track access charges with Lisea, the private company which manages the line, achieving what is reportedly a significant advantage for Le Train. Saumur and Angers in the Loire Valley were announced as additional intermediate stops on services to Nantes and Rennes.

In September 2023, it was reported that Le Train had received an additional €8 million in funding from four investors: Crédit-Agricole Charente-Périgord Expansion, AQUITI Gestion, NACO and Tudigo X Le Train.

In March 2026, Le Train expanded its planned high-speed rail network to include routes connecting Paris with Bordeaux and Rennes. The company signed two framework capacity agreements with SNCF Réseau, the French rail infrastructure manager, to support the development of these additional services.

Le Train is expected to launch operations end 2028.

Le Train Talgo AVRIL
- Manufacturer: Talgo
- Assembly: Rivabellosa, Álava, Spain
- Family name: Talgo AVRIL
- Constructed: 2024–2027 (expected)
- Entered service: 2028 (expected)
- Number under construction: 10
- Capacity: 350-450
- Operator: Le Train

Specifications
- Train length: 201.9 metres (662 ft)
- Width: 3.2 metres (10 ft)
- Maximum speed: 365 km/h (230 mph)

== Rolling stock ==
Under a contract believed to be worth around €300m, Le Train has 10 Talgo AVRIL trains on order from Spanish manufacturer Talgo, with options for additional trains over a 10-year period. Talgo was selected through an EU-wide tendering process in 2022.
