= Talgo AVRIL =

High-speed train

Avril
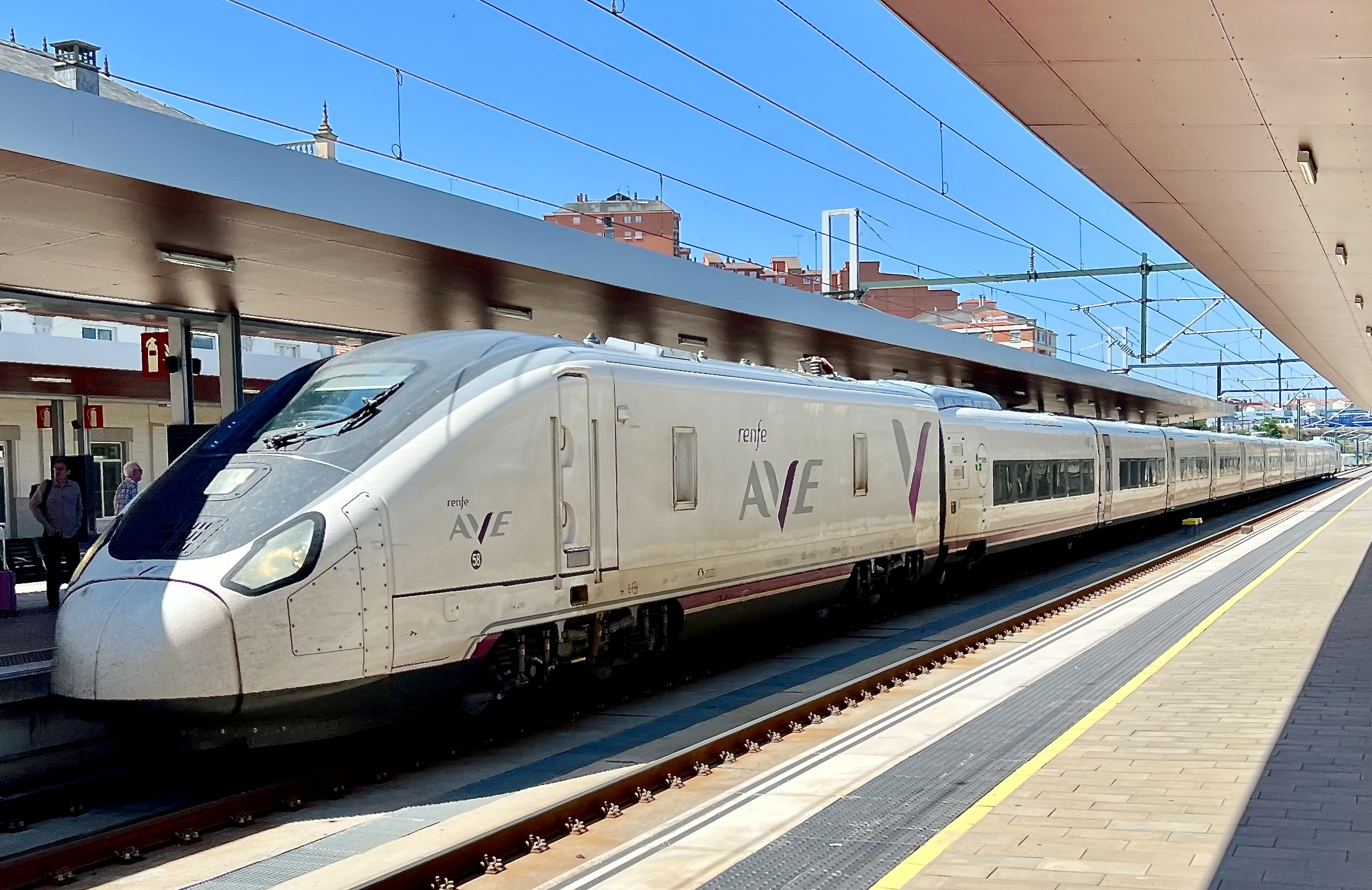
- Renfe Class 106 train at Zamora railway station
- Manufacturer: Talgo
- Family name: Avril
- Constructed: 2012 (prototype)
- Number built: 30
- Formation: 12 passenger cars, 2 power cars
- Capacity: 507 seats - standard 581 seats - Avlo

Specifications
- Car body construction: Aluminum and composites
- Train length: 201.8 m (662 ft 1 in)
- Width: 3.2 metres (10 ft)
- Maximum speed: Service: 300 km/h (190 mph); Certified: 330 km/h (210 mph); Design: 380 km/h (240 mph)
- Weight: 325 t
- Traction system: Ingeteam TR 1000.1/2 3-level IGBT-VVVF
- Power output: 8.8 MW (11,800 hp)
- Power supply: Overhead catenary Option for on board generator (hybrid propulsion)
- Electric systems: 25 kV 50 Hz AC; 1,500 V DC; 3,000 V DC
- Current collection: Pantograph
- Braking systems: Regenerative dynamic braking, pneumatic brake
- Safety systems: ETCS, ASFA, TVM
- Track gauge: Fixed gauge (1435 mm) and variable gauge (1435/1668 mm)

Talgo Avril is a top and tail high-speed power car trainset made by Talgo. It stands for "Alta Velocidad Rueda Independiente Ligero" (roughly translated as "Light High-Speed Independent Wheel"). The trains are designated as Class 106 by Renfe, Spain's national railway operator.

== Design ==
The train is intended to have a designed service speed of 330 km/h (210 mph) and a maximum speed of 380 km/h (240 mph). It has front and rear power cars containing under-floor/over-roof equipment and 12 trailer cars in between the power cars, giving a total seating capacity comparable to those of an electric multiple unit rather than a locomotive-hauled train. The trailer cars have a length of 13 m (42 ft 8 in).

Other details:

- The train is 3.2 metres (10 ft) wide, allowing for a standard 3+2 seating arrangement
- Versions for fixed gauge (1,435 mm, 1,520 mm or 1,668 mm) and variable gauge are planned.
- The traction system is compatible with four voltages—25 kV 50 Hz, 15 kV 16.7 Hz, 3 kV DC, 1.5 kV DC.

The final trains differ significantly from the prototype in design, without the characteristic duck-bill appearance. Initially planned to use ABB traction equipment, Talgo later opted for traction converters from Ingeteam and traction motors from TSA. Renfe's trains each have 11 toilets, 2 wheelchair spaces and display screens behind seats.

== History ==
Talgo presented the Avril concept at the InnoTrans fair in Berlin in September 2010. The prototype, named G3, was approved in Spain on 13 May 2016, traveling more than 76,000 kilometers, and up to 363 km/h.

After several years of development and testing, the first order for Avril trains was placed in November 2016, when Spanish operator Renfe Operadora signed a €786.5 million contract for 15 standard-gauge train sets and 30 years of maintenance. In May 2017, Renfe Operadora ordered another 15 variable gauge train sets for €495 million, with the Avril's entry into service expected in 2021, which was later delayed to March 2024. Renfe sought €116 million in compensation from Talgo for the delays in delivery, later seeking an additional €50 million and €80,000 per day of delay beyond 1 April 2024.

A Talgo Avril train reached 360 km/h top-speed on the Ourense-Santiago de Compostela high-speed line on Iberian gauge as part of homologation testing.

In October 2019, Adif, the Spanish railway infrastructure manager, ordered a single variable gauge trainset for €39 million, designed to serve as a diagnostics train.

In 2023, French operator Le Train signed a €300 million contract for 10 trainsets and 30 years of maintenance.

From 21 May 2024, Renfe scheduled new AVE services to the Spanish regions of Asturias and Galicia, operated by variable gauge Talgo Avril trains. Those AVE services are replacing the previously Alvia services Madrid Chamartín-Gijón and Castellón de la Plana/Vinaros-Gijón via Oviedo in Asturias and the Alvia services Madrid-A Coruña and Madrid-Vigo via Santiago de Compostela, Vilagarcía de Arousa and Pontevedra in Galicia. In addition Talgo Avril was planned to replace Class 102 trains for the Avlo Madrid–Barcelona, Madrid–Valencia, Madrid–Alicante and Murcia–Madrid–Valladolid services.

In July 2026, Renfe and Talgo settled their dispute over delivery delays and technical defects. The agreement unlocked approximately €200 million in withheld payments for Talgo. Renfe agreed to invest €132 million to retrofit its 15 standard gauge trainsets with variable gauge bogies, standardising the entire 30-train fleet. In return, Talgo's €116.6 million late-delivery penalty was restructured, with repayments deferred until 2032.

== Technical issues ==
Since the day of entry into service, the train has suffered numerous incidents, including power failures and software issues. On 5 August 2024, an Avlo train with 494 passengers was delayed for two hours in the Madrid Chamartín-Atocha tunnel due to a power failure. Interior temperatures rose to 40 °C, with passengers breaking windows for ventilation. Renfe issued an apology and blamed Talgo for the issues with the trains.

On 1 January 2025, the trains failed to start due to a software issue in the battery charging system, where it did not recognise the change in year. The issue was resolved the following day.

In July 2025, routine inspections uncovered cracks in the motor bogie of a power car on an Avlo train operating Madrid–Barcelona services. All five trains used for the service were withdrawn from operation. A lack of available spare parts led to the deployment of Class 102 and 103 trains as substitutes. Drivers reported experiencing vibrations and irregular movements at speeds up to 310 km/h. On 25 July 2025, a speed limit of 250 km/h was imposed on a 190 km section of the route for the Class 106 trains from Madrid-Atocha to a point near Calatayud. By September 2025, due to ongoing reliability issues, Renfe permanently withdrew the Avlo S106 fleet from the Madrid–Barcelona corridor on 8 September 2025, replacing the service entirely with Siemens built Class 103 AVE trains.

Persistent technical and signalling incompatibilities between the Class 106 and France's LGV Sud-Est bottlenecked the fleet's international certification. Unable to establish a stable timeline for French approval, Renfe officially cancelled its framework agreement with SNCF Réseau in April 2026, handing back its reserved train paths and indefinitely suspending its planned high-speed services to Paris.

== Gallery ==
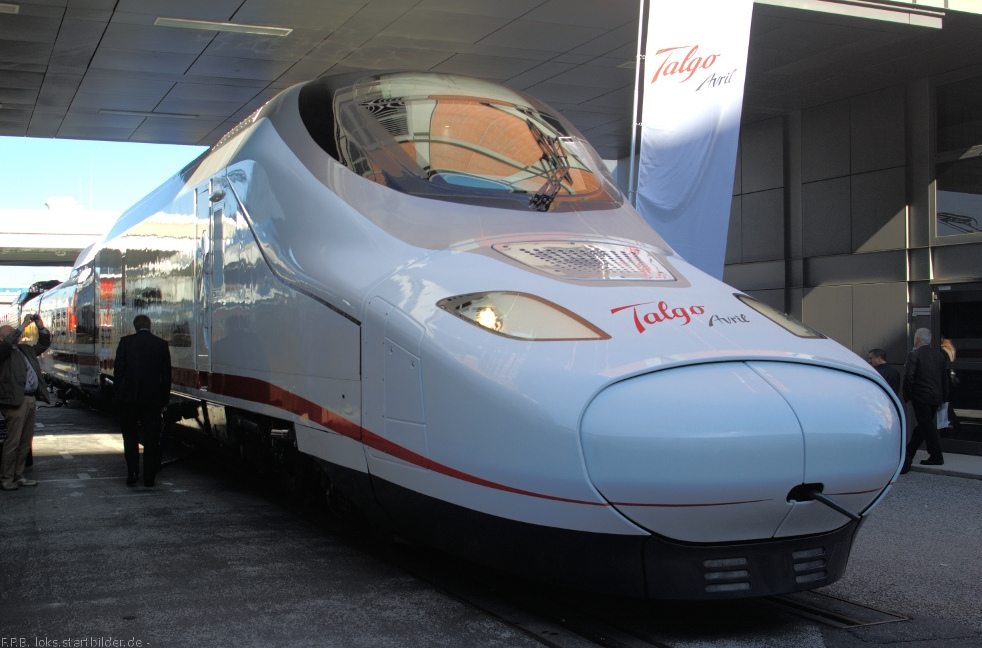
Talgo Avril concept at InnoTrans 2012

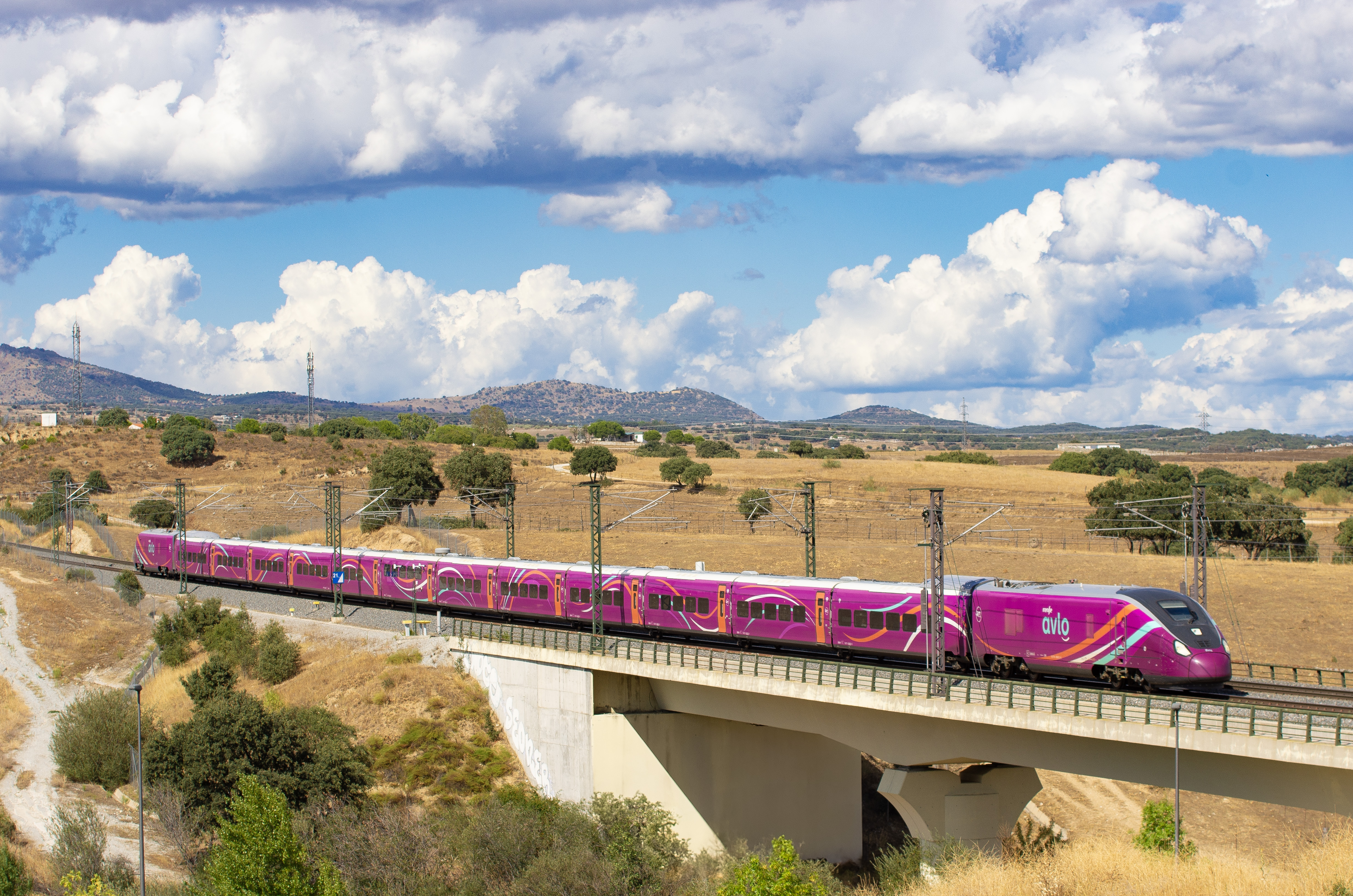
Train operating an Avlo service near Tres Cantos, Madrid

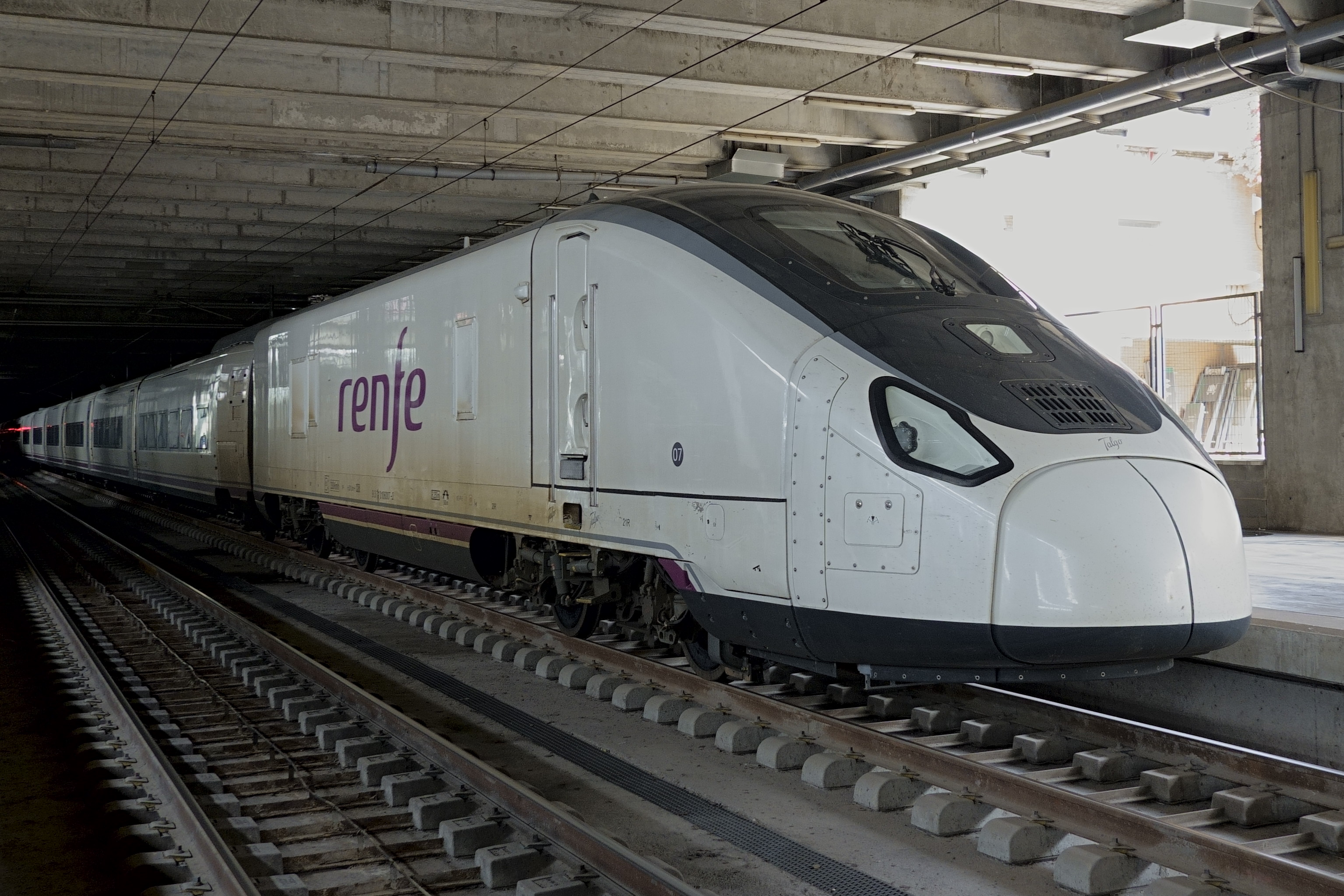
Renfe Class 106 at Córdoba railway station, 2022 (before service entry)

== See also ==
- List of high speed trains
- Talgo
