= Alejandro Goicoechea =

Spanish engineer

Alejandro Goicoechea Omar
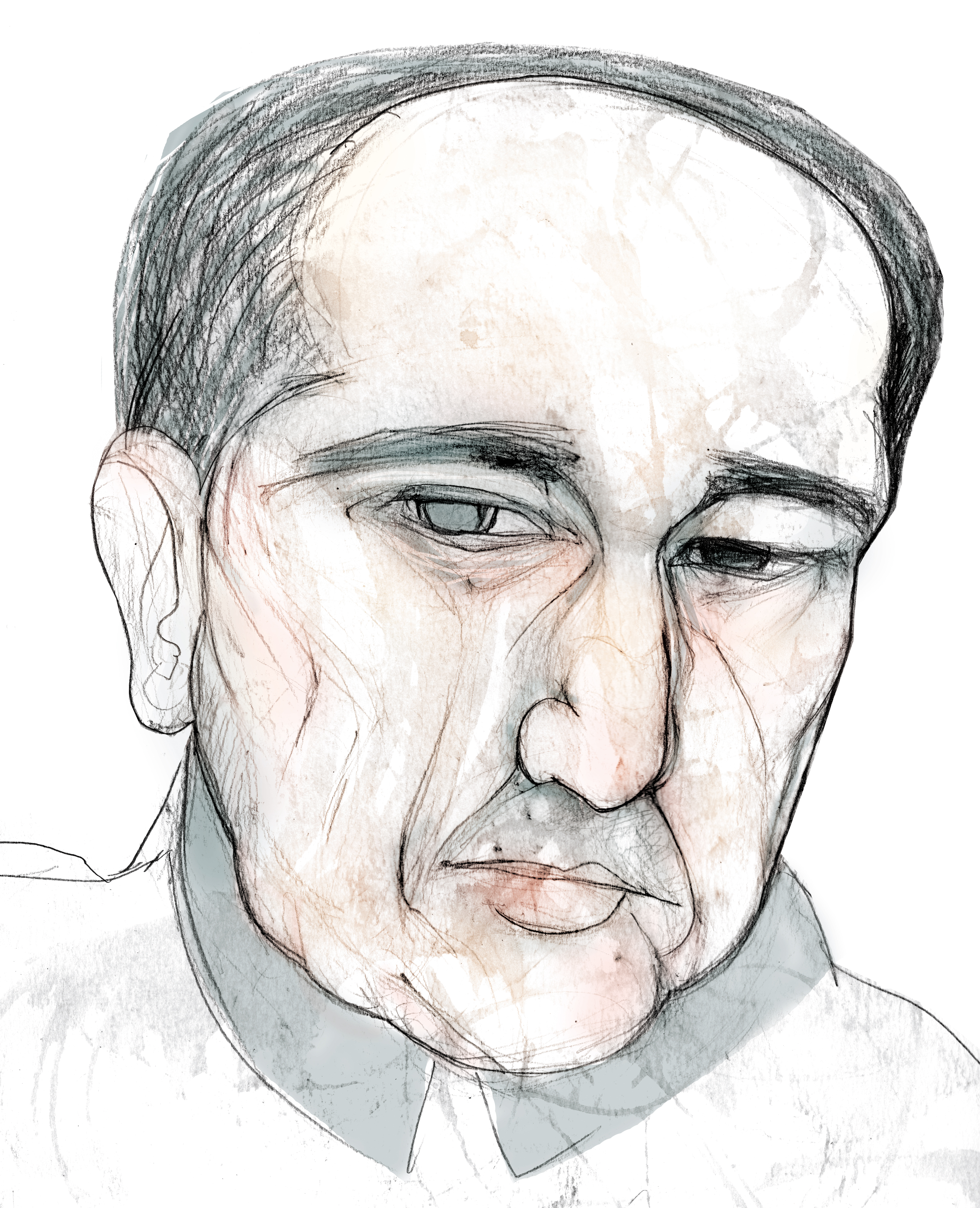
- Portrait of Alejandro Goicoechea Omar. Spanish Foundation for Science and Technology, Eulogia Merle. 2011
- Born: Alejandro Goicoechea Omar; 23 March 1895; Elorrio
- Died: 30 January 1984 (aged 88); Madrid
- Occupation: Engineer
- Known for: founding Talgo, a Spanish manufacturer of trains.

Alejandro Goicoechea Omar (23 March 1895 - 30 January 1984) was a Spanish engineer.

== Biography ==
Goicoechea was born on 1895. He worked for the remote coal narrow gauge railway of La Robla (León), the longest narrow gauge line in Western Europe which today is operated by FEVE, developing a welded steel carriage and various elements of suspension, brakes and traction. In 1936 he suggested a lightweight articulated meter gauge trainset which however was not approved by the management.

Goicoechea authored the Iron Belt to protect Bilbao during the Spanish Civil War. But soon before finishing it he defected to the Nationalist side, and this was decisive in the Nationalists conquering Bilbao on June 12, 1937.

In 1938, he described a train composed of articulated triangular structures with independent wheels, capable of 100 kilometres per hour (62 mph) commercial speeds. In 1941, a test unit composed of triangular chassis and truck wheels with carriage rims welded on was built and tested successfully up to 75 kilometres per hour (47 mph) behind a steam locomotive.

In 1942 Goicoechea worked with the company Hijos de Juan de Garay in Oñate and other companies to build a first test train consisting of seven low-slung cars of only 4.44 metres (4.44 m) length, of a roughly semi-circular cross-section, pulled by a power unit based on a powered bogie from Ganz Works. In the same year he teamed up with José Luis de Oriol y Urigüen, founding the Patentes Talgo company and baptizing the test train Talgo I (Tren Articulado Ligero Goicoechea Oriol). The Talgo I was tested until 1945, then damaged during a test run and scrapped in the early 1950s.

In 1944 Goicoechea started working with the American Car and Foundry Company to design the Talgo II but left the company in 1945 before the train was completed.

Later he suggested a connection between Spain and Morocco by rail tunnel in Gibraltar, which did not become reality.

He died in 1984, aged 89.

== Bibliography ==
- Galán Eruste, Manuel; Cano López-Luzzatti, Miguel (2011). Talgo 1942-2010. From a dream to high speed (in Spanish). Patentes Talgo. ISBN 978-84-938608-1-3.
- Iglesias, Octavio (1996). De dónde vienen las palabras. Diccionario de etimologías (in Spanish). Ediciones Temas de Hoy.
