= Talgo =

Spanish railway rolling stock manufacturer

Talgo, S.A.
- Type: Sociedad Anónima
- Traded as: BMAD: TLGO
- ISIN: ES0105065009
- Industry: Rail vehicle manufacturing
- Founded: 1942
- Headquarters: Las Rozas de Madrid, Spain
- Products: Locomotives; High-speed trains Intercity and commuter trains
- Owner: Trilantic Capital Partners (39.89%); Torrente Blasco Family (5.02%); Amundi Asset Management SA (1.58%); J.M. de Oriol (1.41%); Other (52.10%)
- Number of employees: 1,100 (Spain), 2711 (Company, 2021)
- Website: talgo.com

Talgo (officially Patentes Talgo, SAU) is a Spanish manufacturer of intercity, standard, and high-speed passenger trains. Talgo is an abbreviation of Tren Articulado Ligero Goicoechea Oriol (English: Goicoechea-Oriol Light Articulated Train).

The company was founded by Alejandro Goicoechea and José Luis Oriol. It was first incorporated in 1942.

== History ==
The creation of Talgo can be largely credited to the work of Alejandro Goicoechea and José Luis Oriol. During the 1930s, Goicoechea, a pioneering railway engineer, sought to produce a new generation of rolling stock that would be primarily composed of metal, rather than wood; to reduce operational cost, he also emphasised lightweight yet sturdy construction, while a low center of gravity would deter derailing and thus permit higher operating speeds. In 1942, financial backing for the construction of a prototype train was provided by Oriol, which believed in Goicoechea's concepts. The two produced the agreement that established Patentes Talgo as a company that same year. The prototype train would emerge as the Talgo I.

During the late 1940s, Talgo came to recognise that Spain, and the wider European continent, were in a poor economic condition following the Second World War and so were unlikely to be customers for new rolling stock from an unproven manufacturer. Furthermore, the company was keen to acquire advanced technical knowledge and designs, so a favourable agreement was struck with American Car and Foundry (ACF) to collaborate on the manufacture of the Talgo II in the United States. The first vehicles arrived in Spain in 1950, enabling the first commercial Talgo II service to be run on 14 July of that year, between Madrid, Spain, and Hendaye, France, as a long distance service of Renfe. It was the first train in Spain to be authorized to travel at a service speed of up to 75 miles per hour (120 km/h). Continued collaboration with ACF led to the creation of the Talgo III during the 1960s, making its official debut as an intercity long distance express between Madrid and Barcelona in August 1964.

International rail travel between Spain and the rest of Europe had been historically hampered by the differing track gauge at either side of the Pyrenees. Recognising the value in effectively overcoming that impediment, Talgo developed its own variable-gauge vehicle system, which permitted the first international Talgo trainset, operated by Renfe, to be introduced on passenger services between Barcelona, Spain and Geneva, Switzerland, in 1969. Variable-gauge trains were soon a common feature of overnight services between various Spanish cities and destinations across Western Europe. Even into the 21st century, the variable-gauge system has largely remained unchanged, even on newly built rolling stock. La Gineta is the site of a test track of the Talgo RD railway gauge changer.

During the 1970s, Talgo sought to better accommodate the demand for higher speed trains in Spain. As a consequence of its mountainous terrain, curved tracks prevailed, despite restricting line speeds due to the centrifugal forces exerted on the trains and their contents. To permit higher operating speeds under such conditions, the company developed a tilting train, the Talgo Pendular, that automatically compensated for centrifugal forces by tilting appropriately on bends. Without needing to modify the track infrastructure, this tilting train allowed operating speeds to be increased by up to 25 percent over conventional trains.

During the 1970s and 1980s, the company focused its activities largely on the manufacturing of coaching stock rather than locomotives. A renewed focus on locomotive development, incorporating the automatic variable gauge system, came about during the 1990s. The Talgo XXI pioneered various technologies for the company, including new high-speed running gear and hybrid propulsion technology. In 1988, the Spanish government announced its decision to construct a new dedicated high-speed line between Madrid and Seville. Talgo was keen to produce rolling stock for the new venture and immediately set about designing a new series of trains, the Talgo 350. A key feature of this trainset would be its maximum speed, which was 300 km/h (190 mph). In 1998, Talgo partnered with the multinational rolling stock manufacturer Adtranz to collaborate on its bid to secure a contract to provide the rolling stock for the new high-speed line.

The company's long-term primary customer, and thus the main source of its revenues, is the Spanish railway operator Renfe. By 2001, Talgo was reportedly spending between 10 and 12 percent of its revenues on various research and development programmes.

On 12 May 1999, Talgo announced it had signed a deal to acquire the Finnish rolling stock manufacturer Transtech Oy, which it subsequently reorganised as the wholly owned subsidiary Talgo Oy. In March 2007, Talgo sold its shares in Talgo Oy to a combination of its local management and other Finnish investors, after which the Transtech name was readopted.

During the 2010s, it was decided that Talgo would be reorganised as a public company. In May 2015, the company made an initial public offering (IPO) on the Bolsa de Madrid, during which it was valued at €1.27 billion.

In recent decades, Talgo has made a renewed effort to expand its presence internationally. During the late 2010s, Talgo made arrangements to establish a new train manufacturing site in the United Kingdom in response to orders for its trains having been placed by multiple British railway operators. In the early 2020s, the company invested in new manufacturing facilities in India with the aiming of securing sizable orders from across the country's railways.

In 2025 Basque company Sidenor acquired 20.7% of the company, taking control of it.

== Design ==
Left: Conventional bogie system. Right: Talgo System

Talgo trains are best known for their unconventional articulated railway passenger cars that use between-carriage bogies that Talgo patented in 1941, similar to the earlier Jacobs bogie. The wheels are mounted in pairs but not joined by an axle and the bogies are shared between coaches rather than underneath individual coaches. This allows a railway car to take a turn at higher speeds with less hunting oscillation. As the coaches are not mounted directly onto wheel bogies, the coaches are more easily insulated from track noise. This design has been proposed for further utilisation in the Talgo 22, a double deck train with stepless access from the platform to the lower deck and between carriages.

Talgo trains fitted with variable-gauge axles can change rail gauge – for instance between 1,668 mm Iberian gauge and 1,435 mm standard gauge at the Spanish–French border interchange.

Since the introduction of the Talgo Pendular in 1980, the train tilts naturally inwards on curves, allowing it to run faster on curves without causing discomfort to passengers. The carriage tilting system pivots around the top of the suspension columns, with the effect of partially cancelling the effects of lateral acceleration when cornering.

== Trains ==
Talgo trains are divided into generations. They come in both locomotive-hauled and self-propelled versions.

=== Talgo I ===
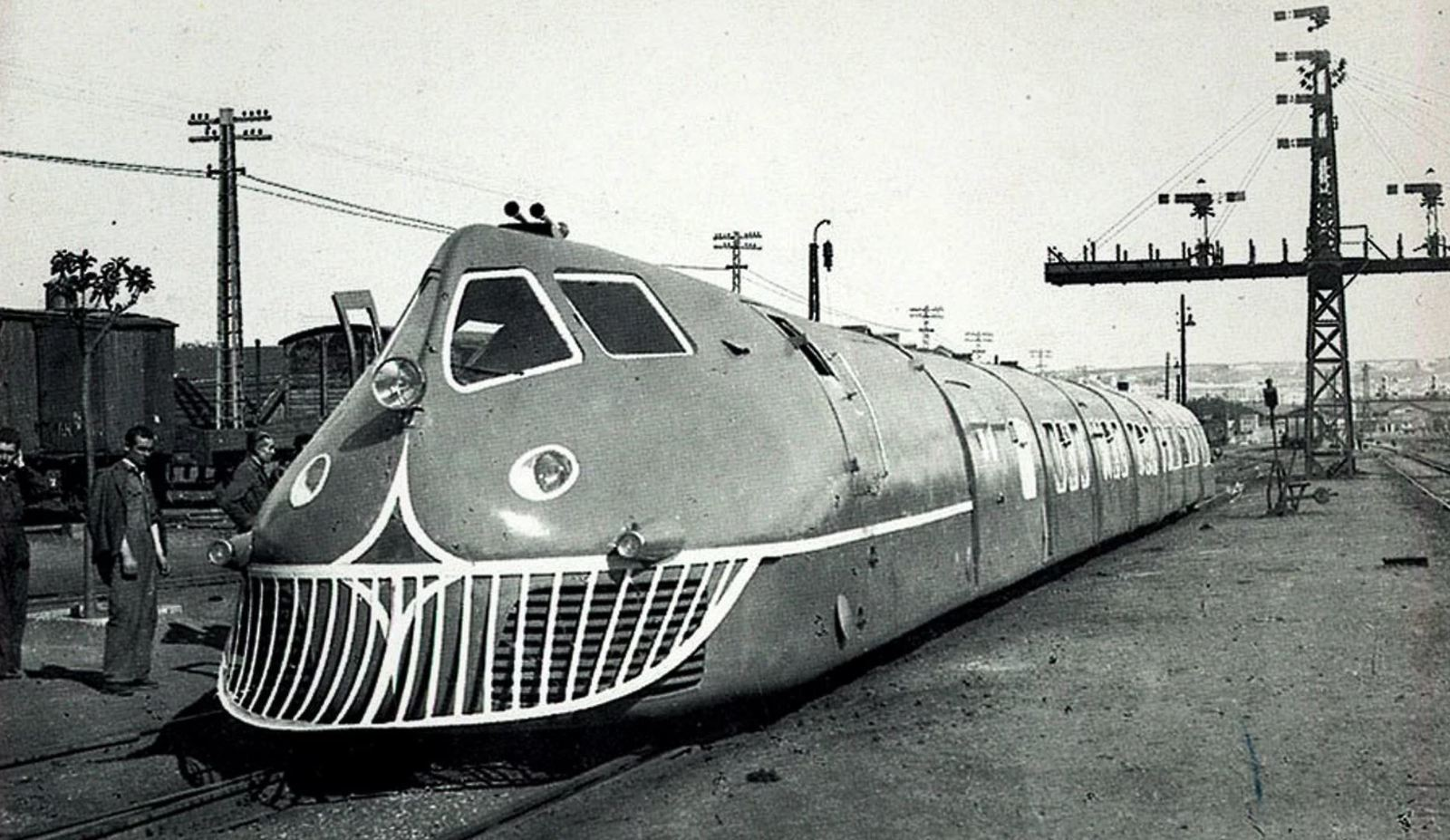
Photograph of Talgo I prototype

The Talgo I was built in 1942 in Spain. The coaches were built at the "Hijos de Juan Garay" workshop in Oñati and the power car was built at the workshops of the "Compañía del Norte" in Valladolid. It was built as a prototype, and it was used to set several rail speed records. The first test run occurred between Madrid and Guadalajara, Castile–La Mancha in October 1942. It had a max speed of 115 km/h (71 mph) on uphills and 135 km/h (84 mph) on flat/downhills. The trainset was destroyed on February 5, 1944, after approximately 3000 km of testing in a fire at its storage location, a warehouse in Cerra Negro.

=== Talgo II ===
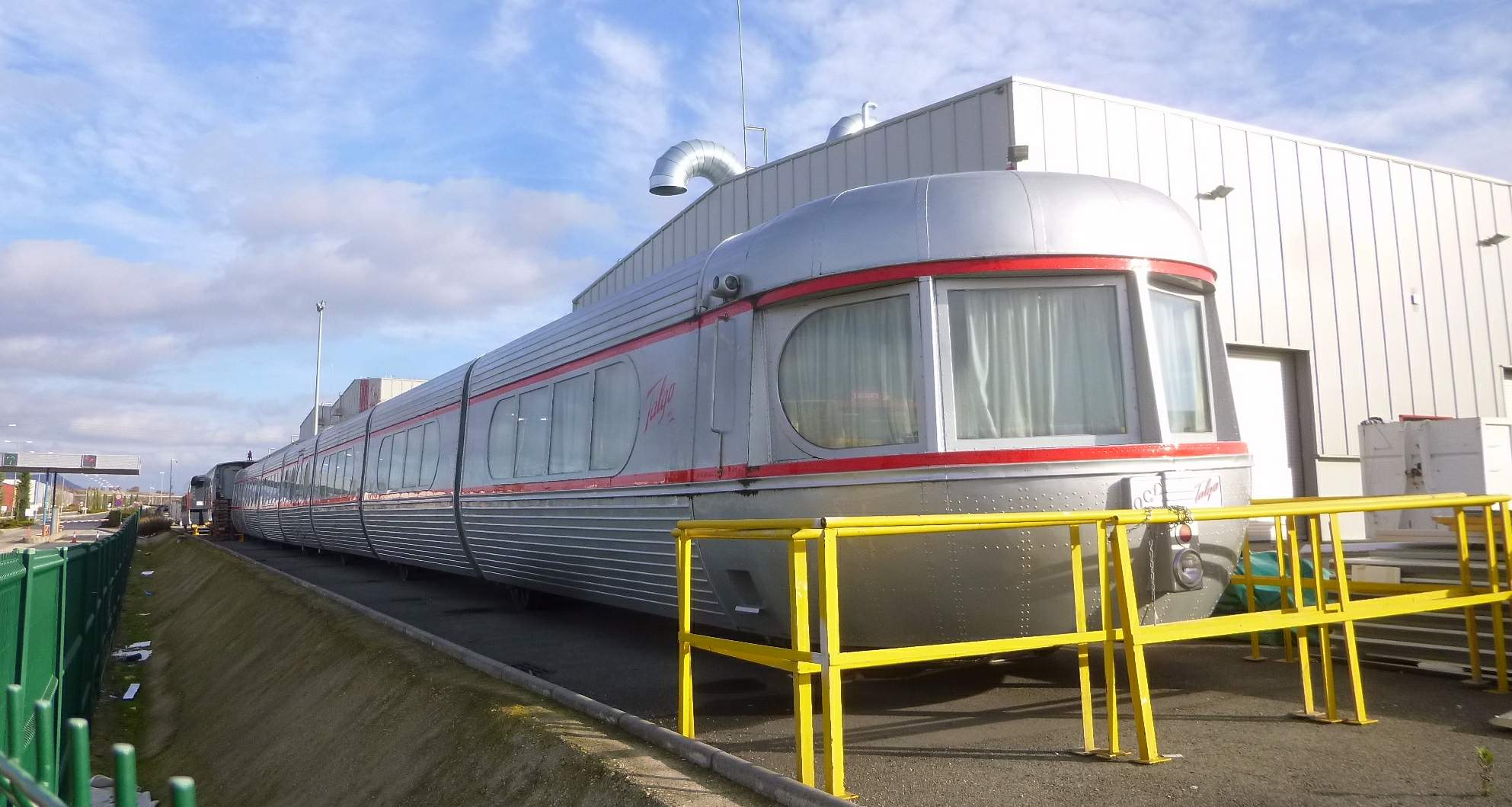
Talgo II

Talgo II coaches and locomotives were first built in 1950 at the American Car and Foundry Company (ACF) works in the United States under the direction of Spanish engineers (the diesel–electric locomotives were assembled by ACF with electrical components made by General Electric). Talgo II carried most of the Jet Rocket train's passengers between Chicago and Peoria, Illinois, after entering service on the Chicago, Rock Island and Pacific Railroad (the Rock Island line) in 1956. Slightly different coaches were later introduced, and the last car type of the Jet Rocket resembled that of the future Talgo III. The New York Central Railroad trialed a complete train until 1958 but saw little success.

Talgo IIs also entered service under Renfe as the Renfe Class 350, where they ran between Madrid and Palencia.

Talgo IIs were also built for the New York, New Haven and Hartford Railroad for its "John Quincy Adams" train from New York City to Boston, Massachusetts, and the Boston and Maine Railroad for its "Speed Merchant" train, running between Boston and Portland, Maine. Soon afterwards, Talgo II trains began running in Spain and were successfully operated until 1972.

=== Talgo III ===
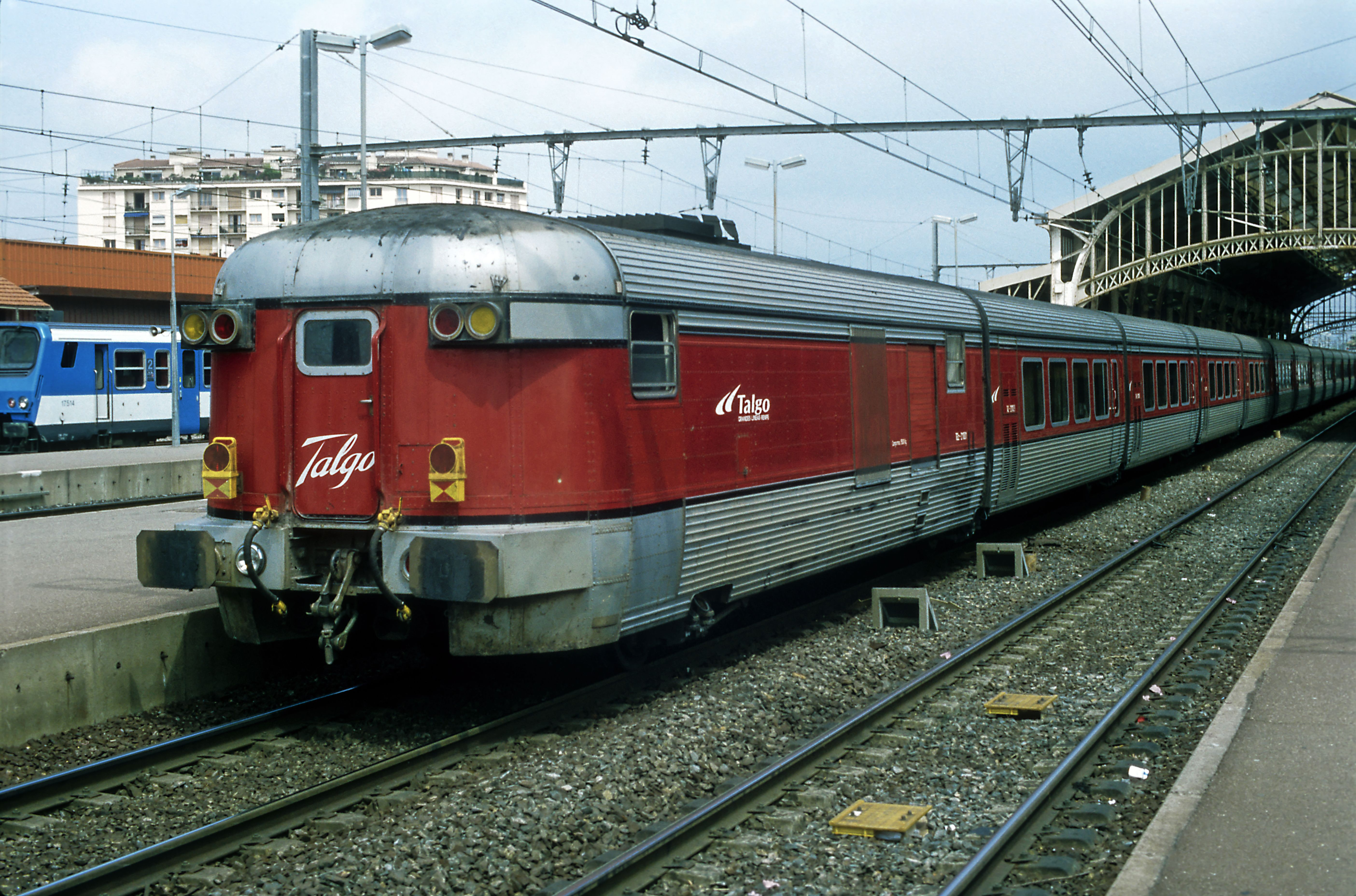
Talgo III

Talgo III coaches and locomotives entered service in 1964, introducing longer cars and easy directional reversibility of the coaches. The Talgo III/RD was equipped with variable gauge axles, and this permitted the introduction, on 1 June 1969, of the first through train between Barcelona and Geneva (the Catalan Talgo), despite the difference in rail gauge. The same equipment was used for the Barcelona Talgo, which began operation on 26 May 1974 as the first-ever through train service between Barcelona and Paris.

=== Talgo Pendular ===
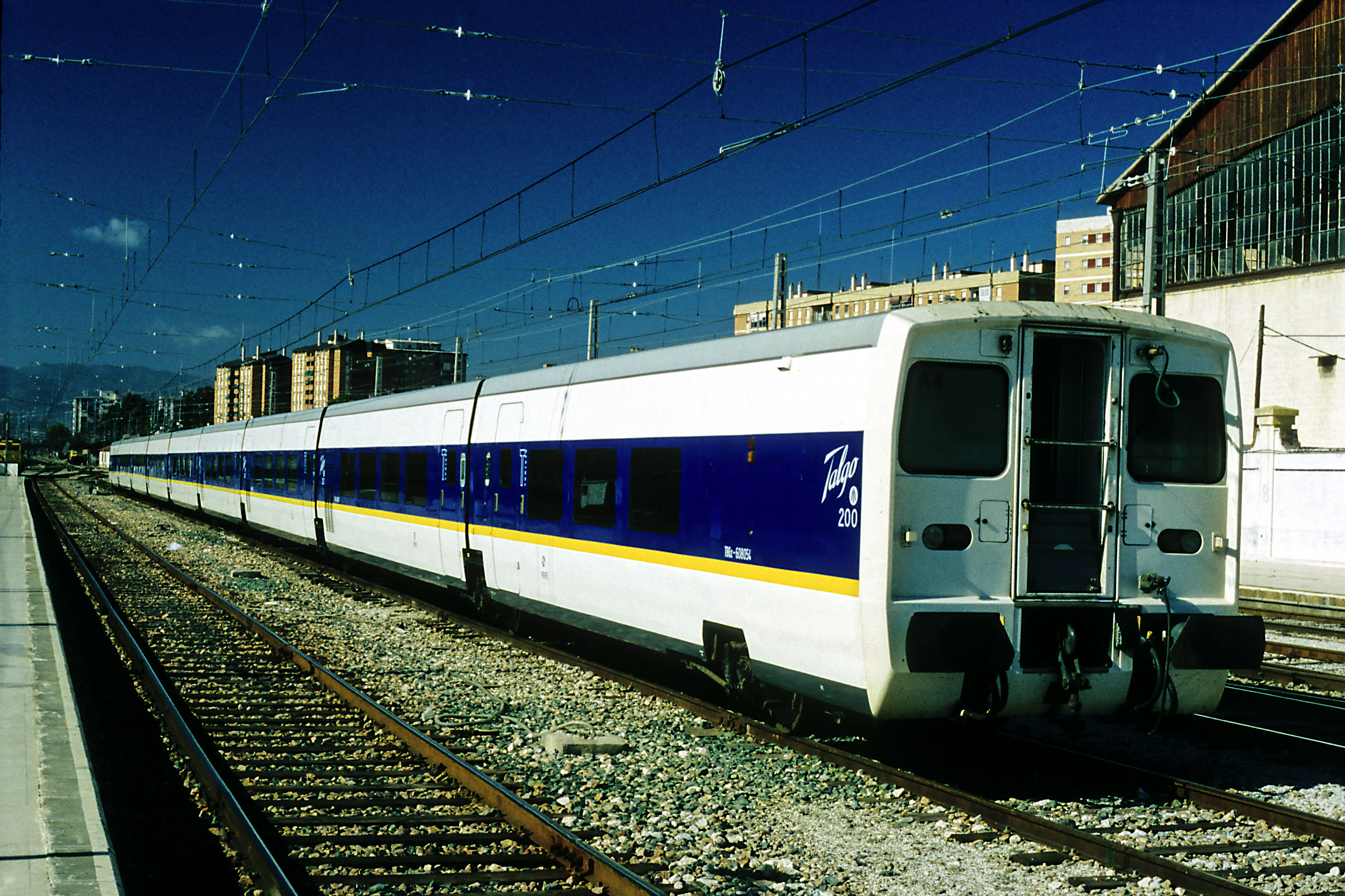
Talgo Pendular (Talgo VI)

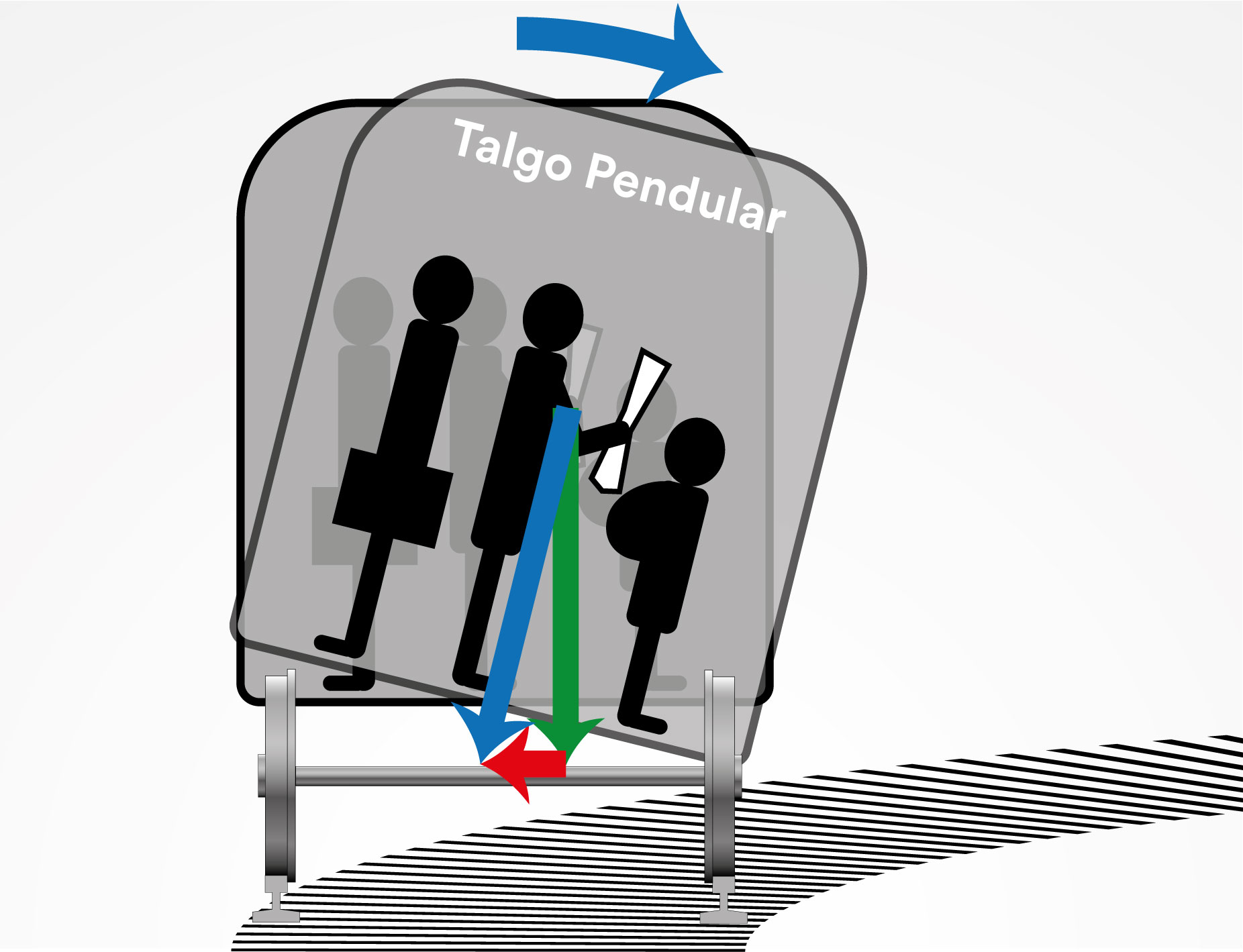
Functional principle of tilting – green: gravity, red: centrifugal force, blue: resultant force

The Talgo Pendular (Talgo IV and Talgo V, also VI & Talgo 200 or 6th generation), introduced in 1980, created the "natural tilting" train, using a passive system that tilts the carriages with no need for electronic sensors or hydraulic equipment. The wheels are mounted on mono axles between the carriages, and sitting on top of the axles are suspension columns. The carriages are attached to the top of the suspension columns and swing inwards as the train goes through a curve.

In 1988, a Talgo Pendular was used on trials for Amtrak on the Boston–New York corridor in the United States and on Deutsche Bahn lines in Germany. Trial commercial services with Talgo cars in the US commenced in 1994 between Seattle and Portland, and from 1998 different trains have been used on the Amtrak Cascades services from Vancouver, British Columbia, to Seattle, Washington, continuing via Portland, Oregon to Eugene, Oregon. Five Talgo IV trains were in use in Argentina on the General Roca Railway. They have since been replaced by CRRC Dalian rolling stock. In September 2022, the Talgo IV sets were transported to the Villa Luro workshop to undergo repairs, aiming to add an extra daily service between Buenos Aires and Rosario. The sets used on the Amtrak Cascades have been replaced by Amtrak-owned Horizon cars.

Talgo 200 series trains are also in use in Kazakhstan for the Almaty–Astana overnight train.

=== Talgo VII ===
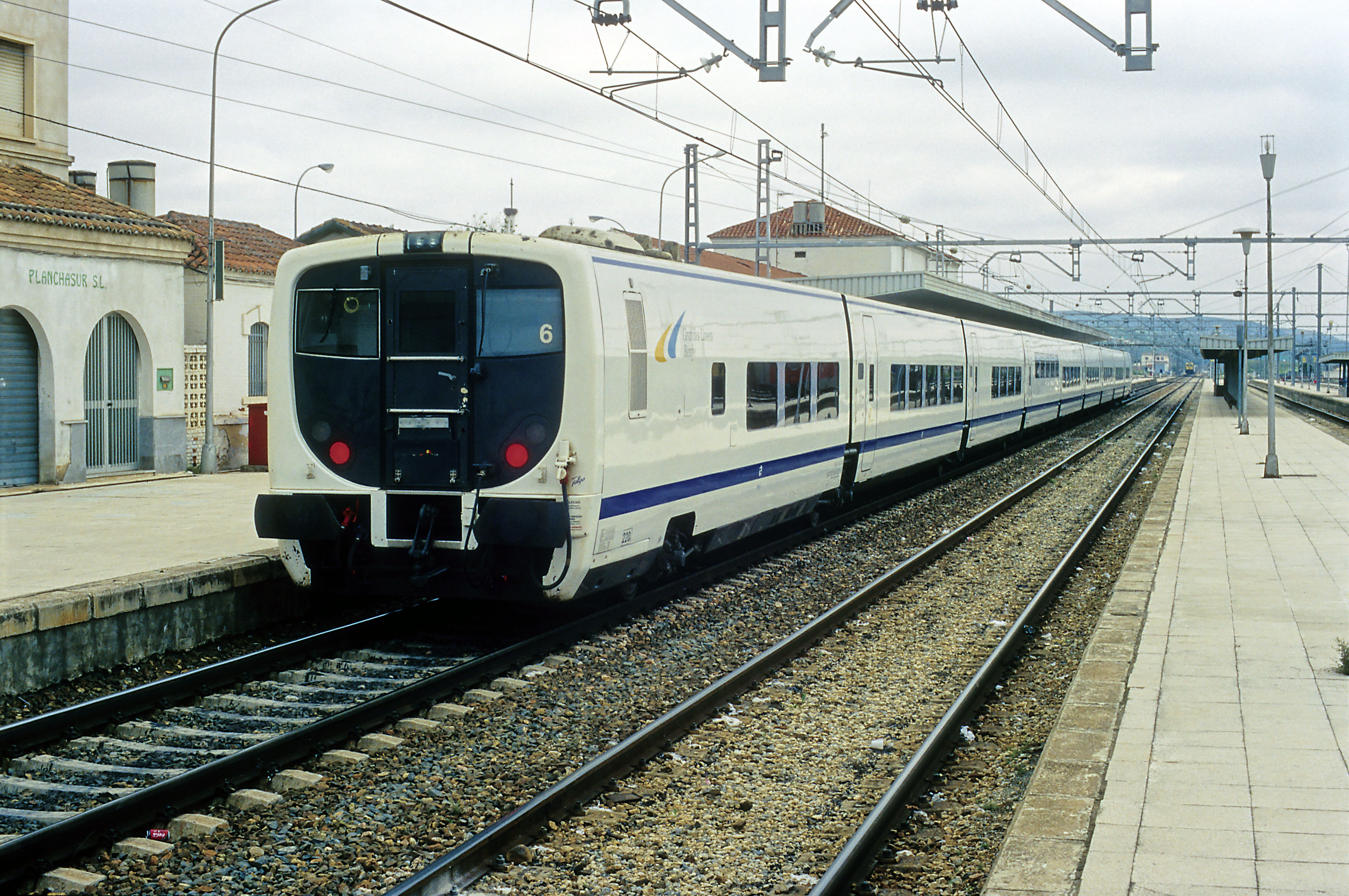
Talgo VII cars

The Talgo VII introduced beginning in 2000 is used as a locomotive-pulled train set as well as intermediate cars for the multiple units Talgo 250, Talgo 350 and Talgo XXI. The carriages are similar to the Talgo Pendular type but have an air-controlled hydraulic brake system and power supply from head end power instead of diesel engine–generators in the end cars. Talgo VII trains have a car which has two pairs of wheels in the middle of the set (of cars) rather than at one end of the set, which is the case for earlier Talgo trains. All the other cars in the set have a single pair of wheels.

=== Talgo 8 ===
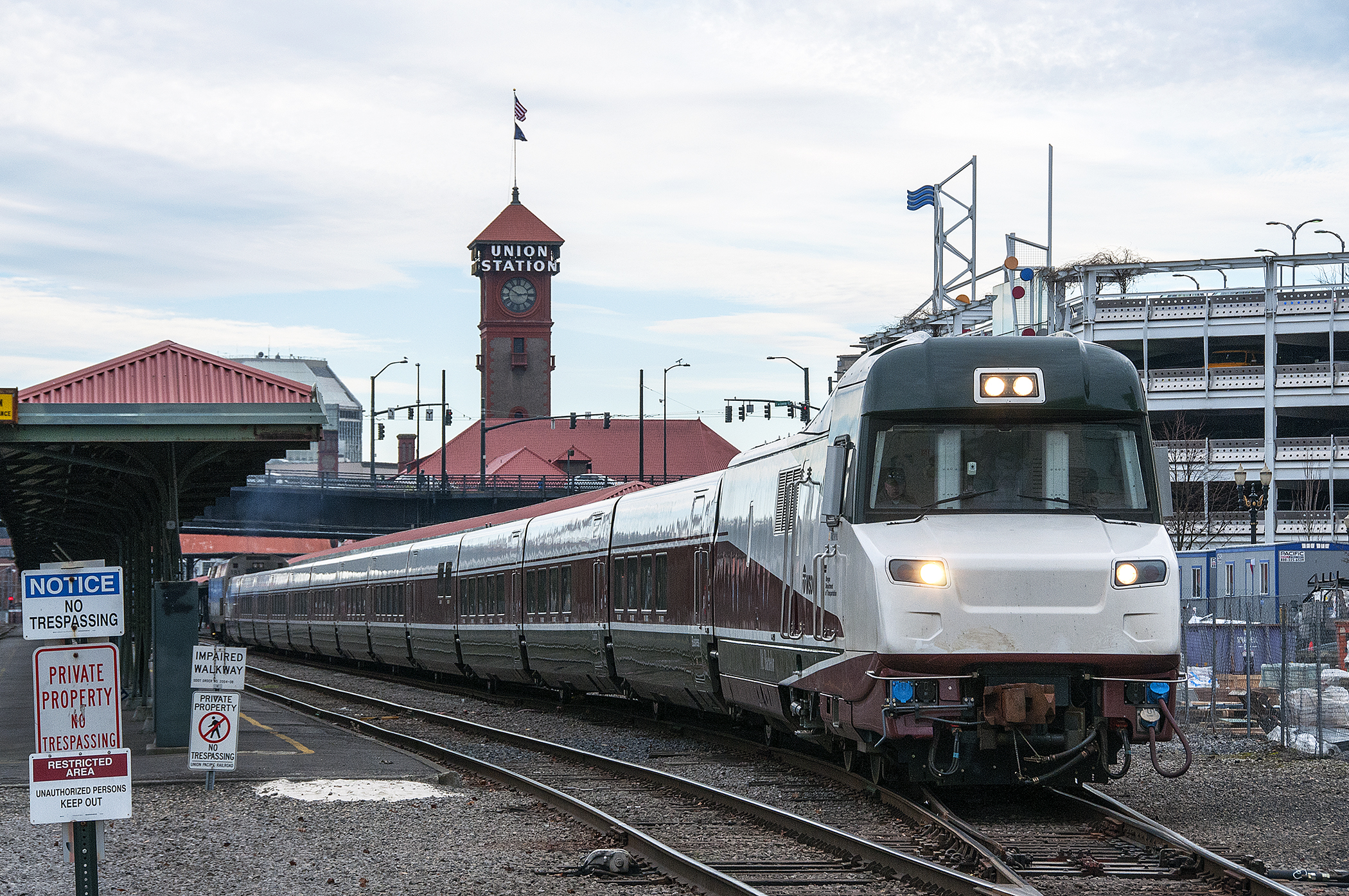
Talgo Series 8

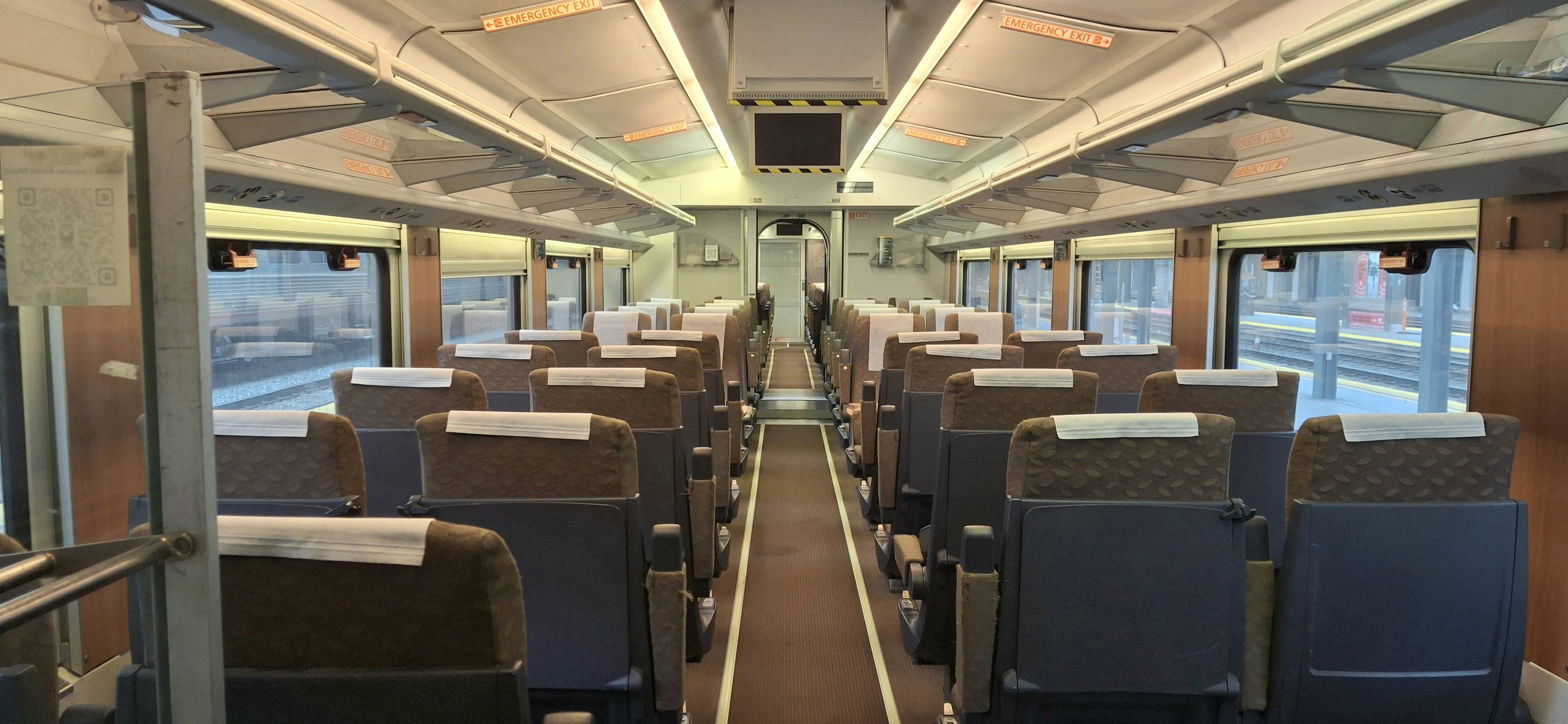
The inside of a Talgo Series 8 Coach

The Series 8 passenger cars are similar to the Series VII cars, but has an unpowered diesel generator control car for push–pull operation and a two-axle end bogie. Each trainset has two accessible cars with 21 seats, three coaches with restrooms (29 seats), four coaches without restrooms (37 seats), a dining car and bistro car with table seating, a baggage car and combined cab and power car. All business cars and coaches have space for one accessible seat, seating 286 seats. These trains are designed for the North American market. Talgo made an agreement in 2009 to build a manufacturing facility in Wisconsin which would initially supply two 14-car trainsets for the Amtrak Hiawatha until the project was cancelled. The company expressed hope the plant would later be used to build trains for other U.S. rail projects.

Early in 2010, the Oregon Department of Transportation announced that it had negotiated the purchase of two 13-car trainsets for use in the Pacific Northwest rail corridor between Eugene and Vancouver, British Columbia. These trainsets were also manufactured in Wisconsin and were delivered in 2013. The sets are currently operating in the "Cascades" corridor in the Pacific Northwest. They have been integrated with the five existing sets in regular service. The Series 8 trains offer passengers many modern amenities including high-speed Wi-Fi, reclining seats and a full-service bistro and lounge car.

In 2014, the state of Michigan expressed interest in operating the unused Talgo 8 cars for their Amtrak Wolverine service. Three years later, Amtrak proposed to lease or buy the unused cars in the wake of the 2017 Washington train derailment. Ultimately, the two trainsets were sold to Nigeria for use on the Lagos Rail Mass Transit.

=== Talgo 9 ===
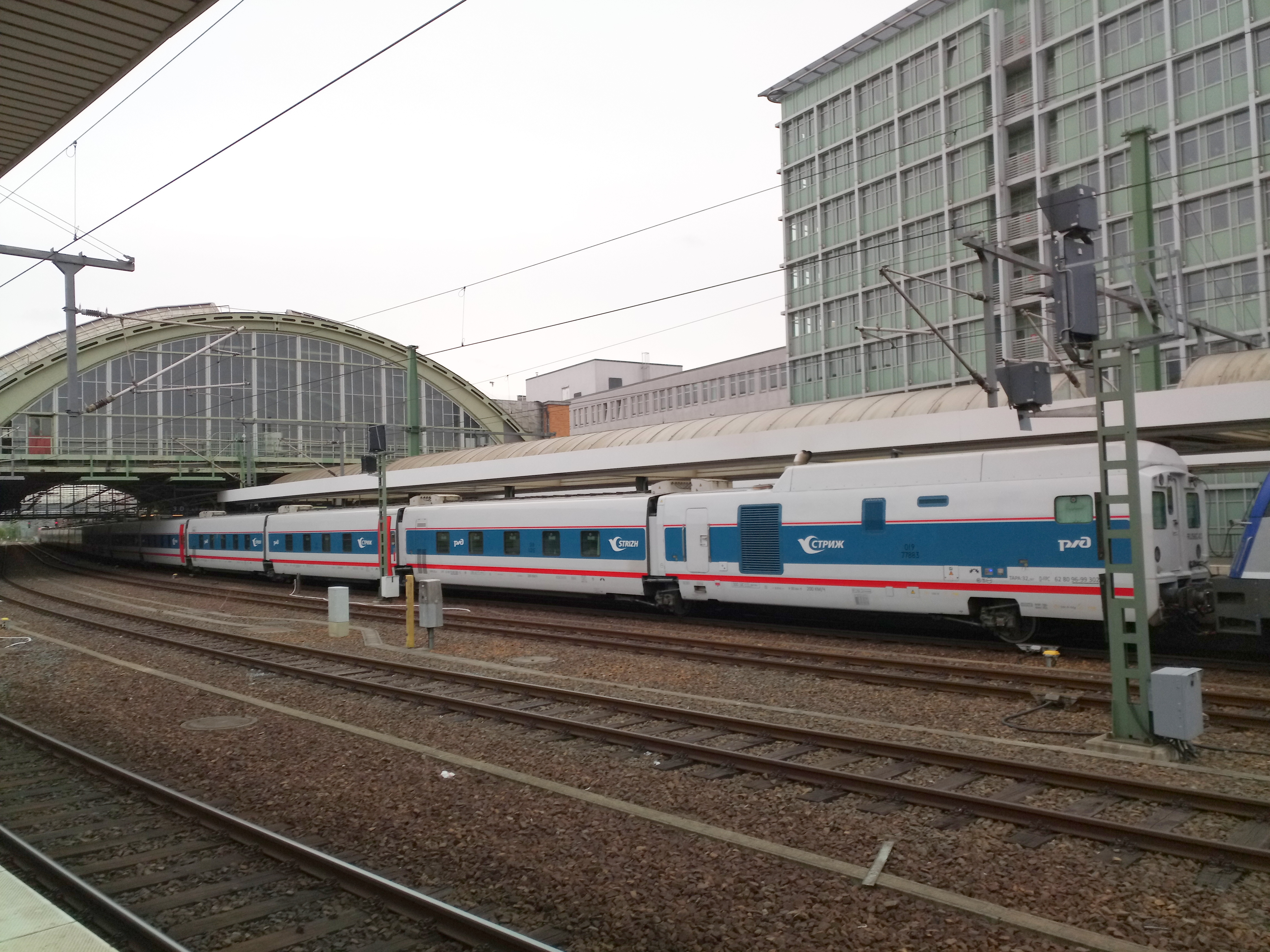
Talgo 9 cars of Strizh (Swift) train in Berlin

This series, which was originally designed for Russia and Kazakhstan, featured wide bodyshells and wheelsets. There are three versions: 1520 mm fixed gauge, 1520–1435 mm variable gauge, 1520–1676 mm variable gauge. They are used in the Berlin–Moscow line (December 2016) and St. Petersburg–Moscow–Samara (August 2020).

In July 2015, Talgo stated its intention to ship a Series 9 train to India at its own cost as a demonstration on the Mumbai–Delhi rail route. On 10 September 2016, the final successful test run of the Talgo 9 series coaches was completed in India.

=== Talgo 250 HSR ===
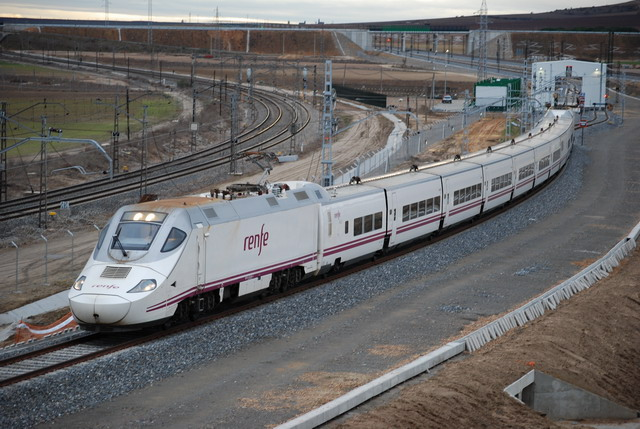
Renfe class 130

The Talgo 250 is a dual voltage electric push-pull train (AC/DC) equipped with variable gauge axles. This allows the units to be used on high-speed lines and on conventional broad gauge lines. A Talgo 250 train consists of two power cars and 11 Talgo VII intermediate coaches. This class was developed for Renfe (classed as S-130).

Uzbekistan Railways ordered two Talgo 250 sets of a Russian gauge version in 2009. The first set arrived at Tashkent in July 2011.

=== Talgo 250 Hybrid ===
The Talgo 250 Hybrid is a dual-voltage, dual-power push-pull train equipped with variable gauge axles. The train is therefore also able to operate on non-electrified lines. A Talgo 250 Hybrid train consists of two power cars, two technical end coaches and nine Talgo VII intermediate coaches. The trains were developed for Renfe and classed initially as S-130H, later as S-730. They are rebuilt from existing Talgo 250 trains. One trainset (RENFE Class 730) was involved in the Santiago de Compostela accident on 24 July 2013.

=== Talgo 350 HSR ===
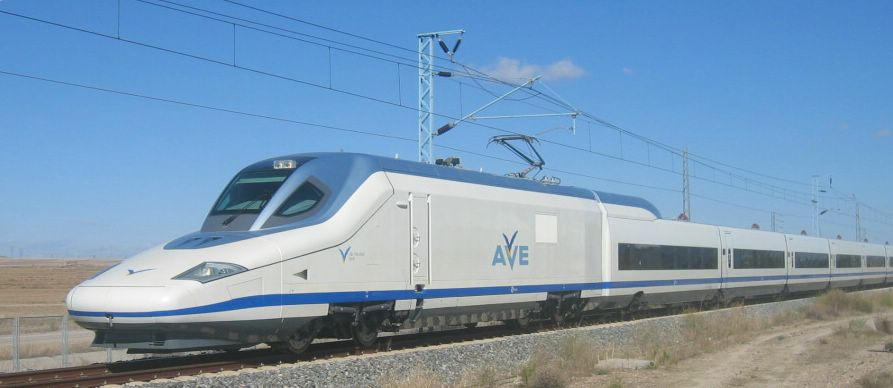
Talgo 350 train as used for AVE high-speed services between Madrid and Valencia

The Talgo 350 entered service as the Renfe AVE Class 102 marking the company's entry into the high-speed train manufacturing market. Tests with the prototype commenced in 1994, and Talgo 350 trains have been operating at a top commercial speed of 330 km/h on the Madrid–Barcelona and Madrid–Valladolid lines since 22 December 2007. This series of push-pull trains is designed to reach a speed of 350 km/h (220 mph), although present lines and commercial services limit the speed to 330 km/h (205 mph). The train consists of two power cars and Talgo VII intermediate cars with improved brakes and additional primary suspension.

=== Talgo XXI HSR ===
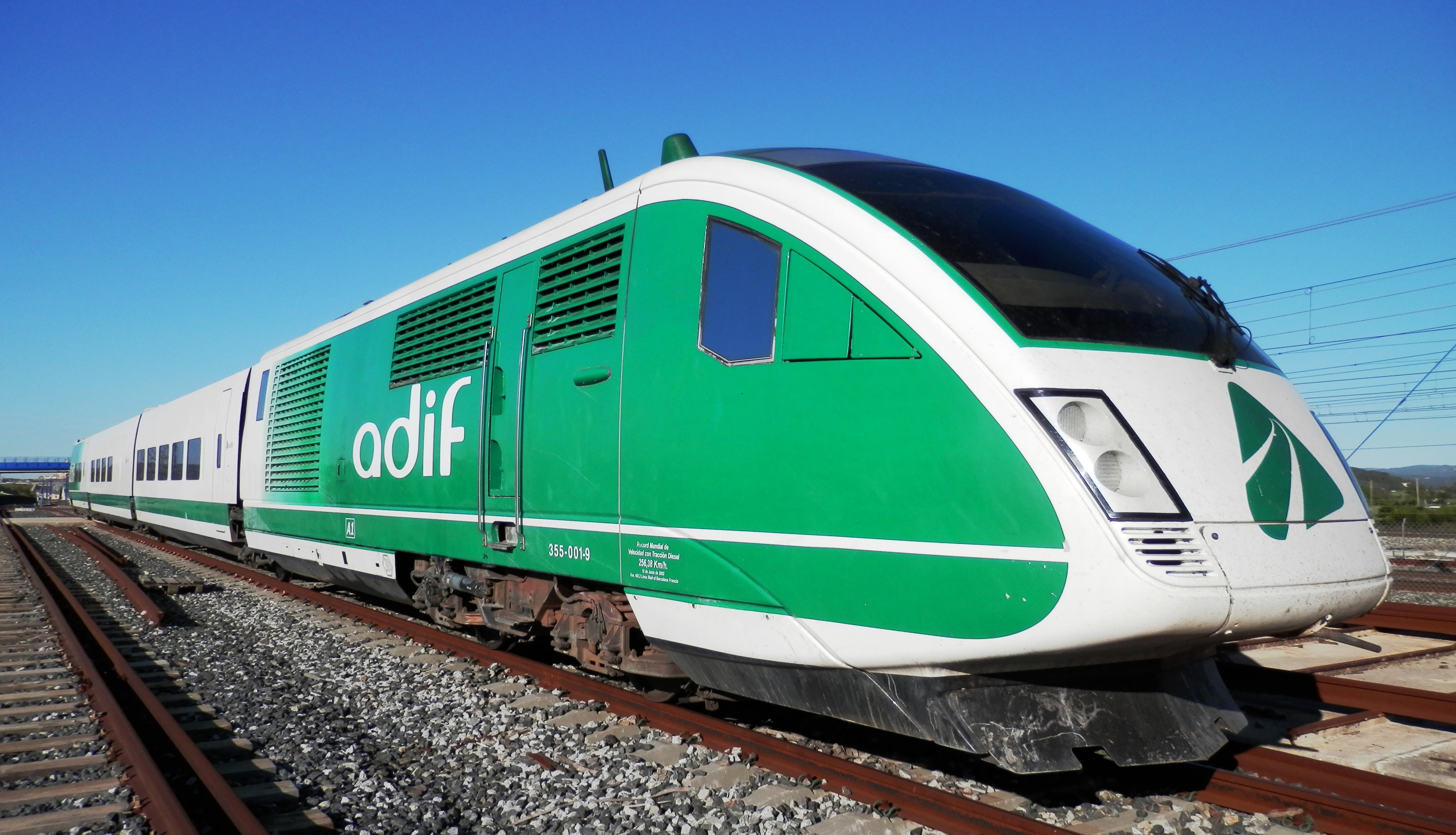
Renfe class 355 / Talgo XXI / Talgo BT

Talgo XXI is a project for a high-speed diesel-powered train, that operates in a push-pull with one or two power cars and Talgo VII intermediate cars. The North American version has four-axle power cars in compliance with United States FRA regulations. Only one train in compliance with European UIC standards has been built to date. Talgo reported that the Talgo XXI attained 256 km/h (159 mph) on the Olmedo–Medina del Campo high speed experimental line on 9 July 2002, which led to a claim for the world speed record for a diesel train. However, this claim was never proven. After the test runs the train was sold to the Spanish infrastructure authority ADIF as a measuring train for high-speed lines.

Possible specs are:

- Two MTU 12V 4000 R64 engines (two power car configuration) or one MTU 12V 4000 R84 engine (one power car configuration), up to 1,800 rpm, high-speed diesel, Euro IIIB compliant with diesel particulate filter and exhaust gas recirculation after-treatment system
- 2 x 1,500 kW (2,000 hp), (3 MW [4,000 hp]) or 1,800 kW (2,400 hp)
- Voith hydraulic transmission
- Hydrodynamic and air braking
- Variable gauge
- 5 to 12 passenger coaches, depending on the setup
- Up to 400 seats
- Designed for a top speed of 220 km/h (140 mph)
- Power car with a shared trailer axle

=== Talgo AVRIL HSR ===
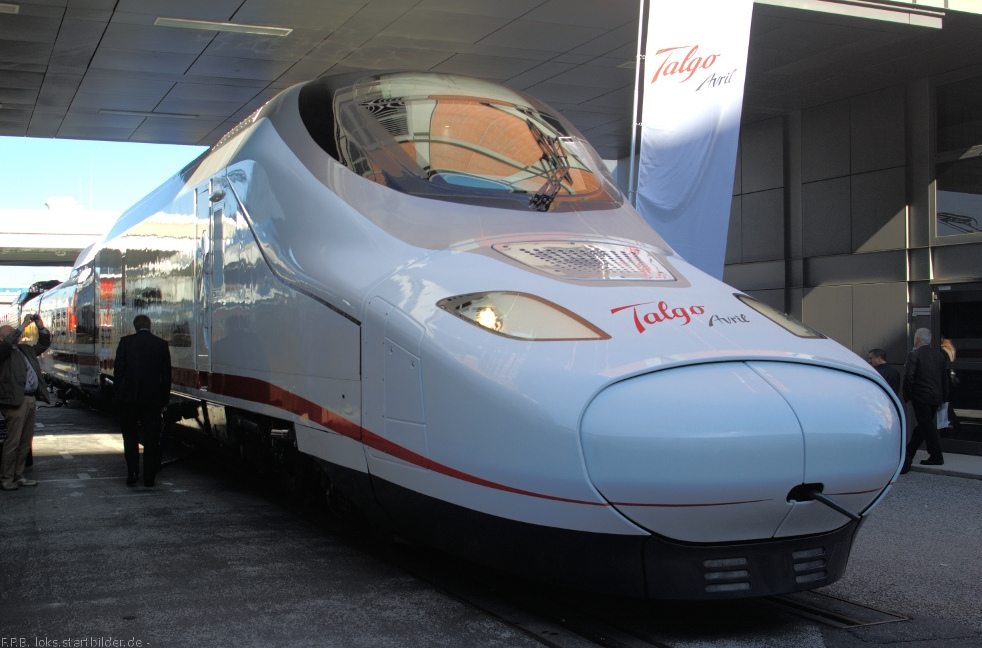
Talgo AVRIL in the International Exhibition InnoTrans, Germany 2012

Talgo has developed recently a push-pull train known as "AVRIL" (Alta Velocidad Rueda Independiente Ligero — Light High-Speed Independent Wheel), intended for speeds of 380 kilometres per hour (240 mph). The system uses underfloor traction in the front and rear vehicles, with the intermediate carriages having the Talgo Pendular system (which cannot use motored axles on the axles corresponding to the system). The train also has the option for variable gauge axles. Starting with the concept stage in 2009, it began dynamic testing on the Spanish high-speed network in 2014, and was approved in May 2016. It won its first major contract in November 2016 from Renfe for the Mediterranean corridor in Spain, and its link to Paris. The first AVRIL trains started operations in May 2024 on routes from Madrid to Catalonia, Asturias and Galicia.

=== Talgo Egypt ===
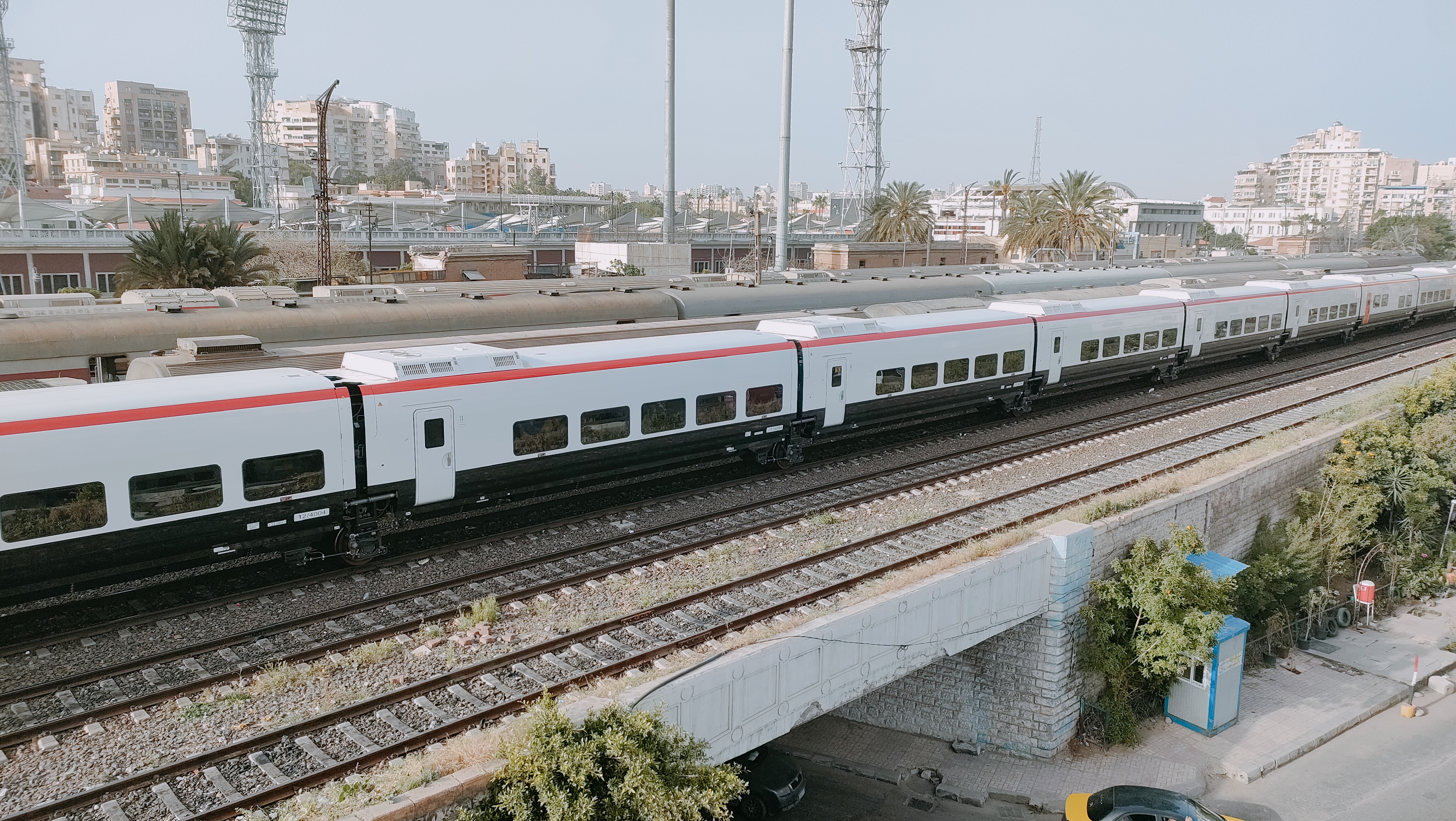
Egyptian Railways Talgo

In April 2019, Egypt ordered new Talgo trains. Egypt contracted for six trains from Talgo Company, but they became seven trains due to a delay in the delivery date to Egypt. This negates the words of the Minister of Transport who justified that train is a gift from the company for President Abdel Fattah El-Sisi.

On 9 August 2022, Egypt contracted for seven trains from Talgo, which included 15-year maintenance, for 280 million euros. The trains will be delivered at the beginning of 2024.

=== Talgo 230 ===
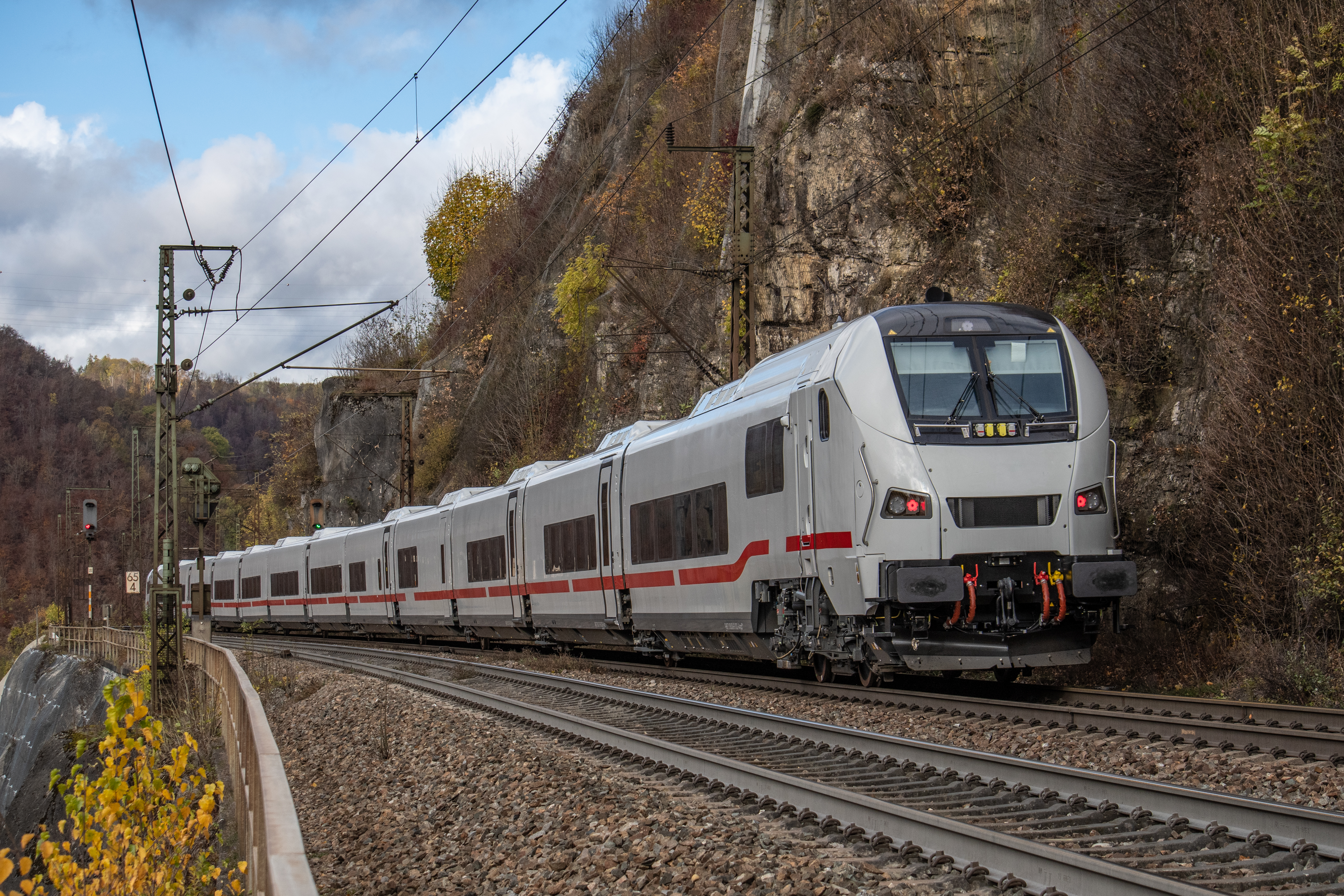
Talgo 230 as DB ICE L

The Talgo 230 (such named because of its 230 km/h top speed) is a low floor, locomotive-hauled push-pull trainset meant for long distance intercity trains, as of early 2026 it has been purchased by DB Fernverkehr as its ICE L, by FlixTrain and by DSB. It can be bought with a Talgo Travca locomotive if so desired. These locomotives are to be operated by DB as the DB Class 105.

== Variable Gauge Axles (VGA) ==
In addition to the multiple units with variable gauge, in 2005 Talgo built a prototype of a variable-gauge locomotive (the L-9202, TRAV-CA, 130-901 or Virgen del Buen Camino).

== See also ==
- Articulated car
- EMD LWT12
- Haramain High Speed Rail Project
- FM P-12-42
- UAC TurboTrain
- Wheelset (railroad)
