= Sidenor =

Spanish steel company

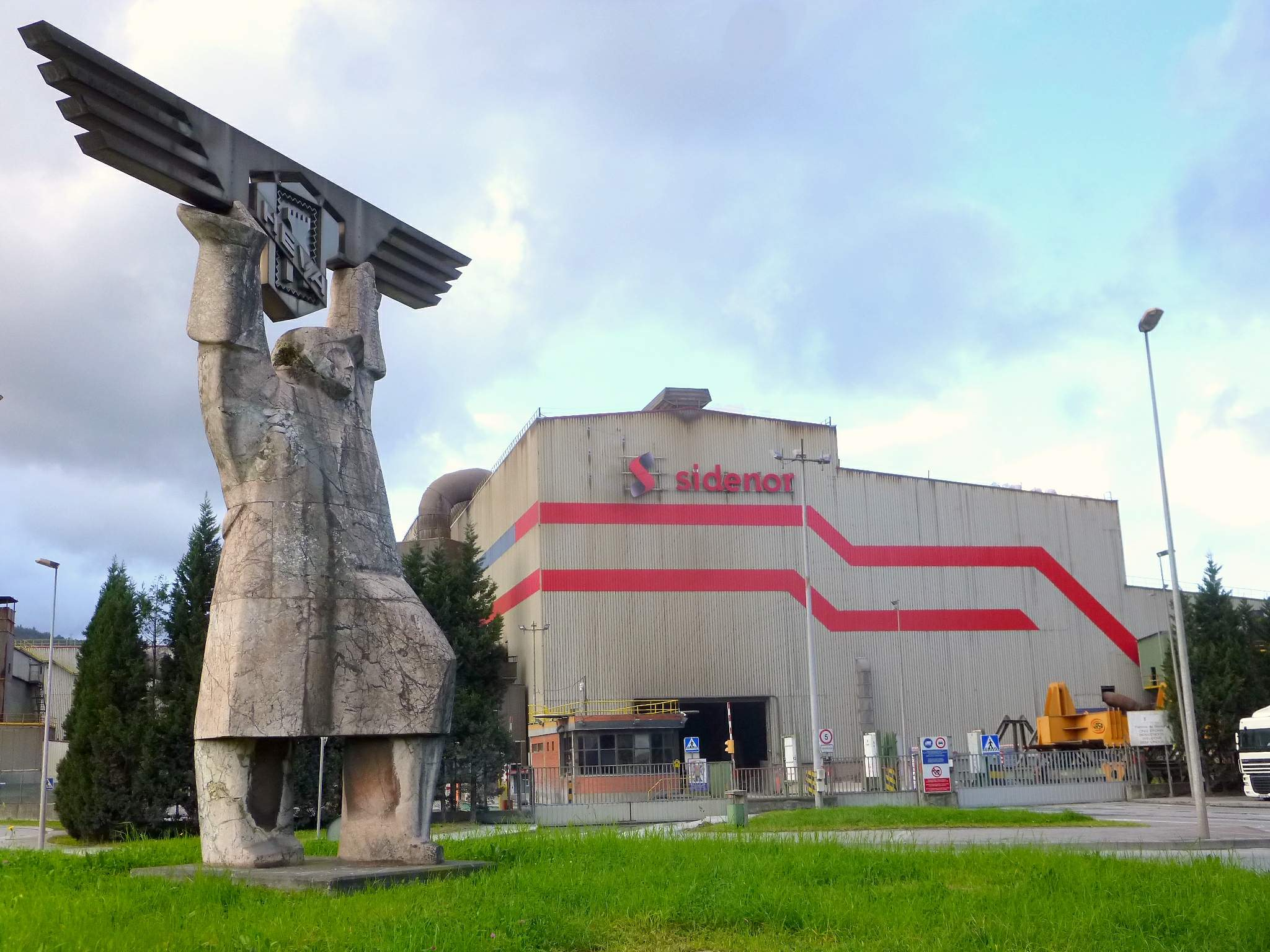
- Company type: Private company
- Industry: Steel and iron
- Founded: 1990
- Headquarters: Basauri

Sidenor is a Spanish steel company founded in 1990 through the merger of Forjas y Aceros de Reinosa. Headquartered in Basauri, it operates in throughout Spain, as well as metal recycling facilities in Azuqueca de Henares and Sagunto. Sidenor is a major European company in steel products.

== History ==
In 1990, Forjas y Aceros de Reinosa merged with the Acenor Group (formed in 1988 from Aceros de Llodio, Pedro Orbegozo, Forjas Alavesas, and Aceros Echevarría), creating Sidenor, jointly owned by the National Institute of Industry and the Official Credit Institute. In 2019, Sidenor announced that it had reached an agreement to sell 75% of the Reinosa plant to the multinational group NFL, although it would remain as a temporary partner for six years.
