= TGV Duplex =

French double-deck high-speed train

SNCF TGV Duplex
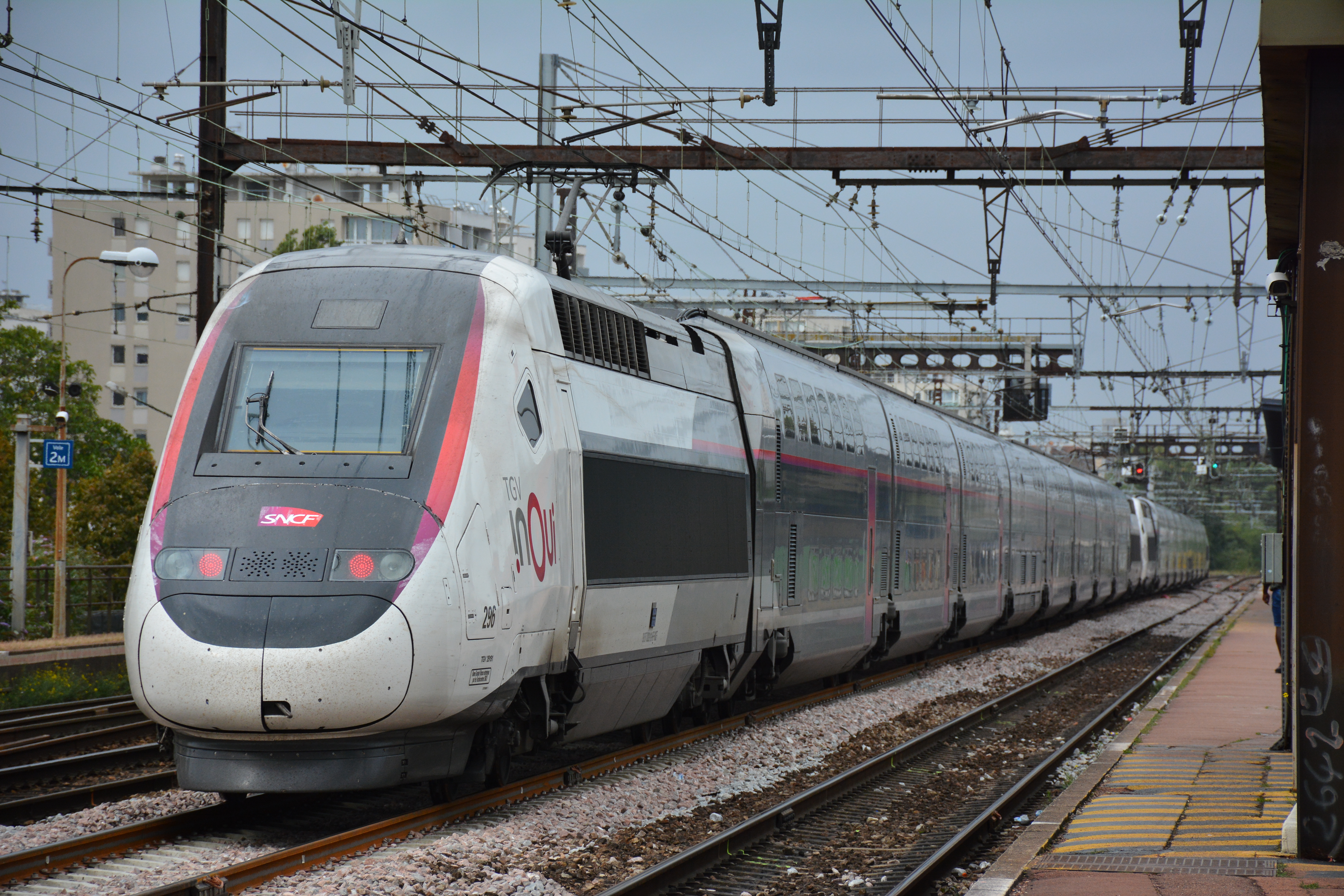
- TGV Duplex in Le Vert de Maisons station

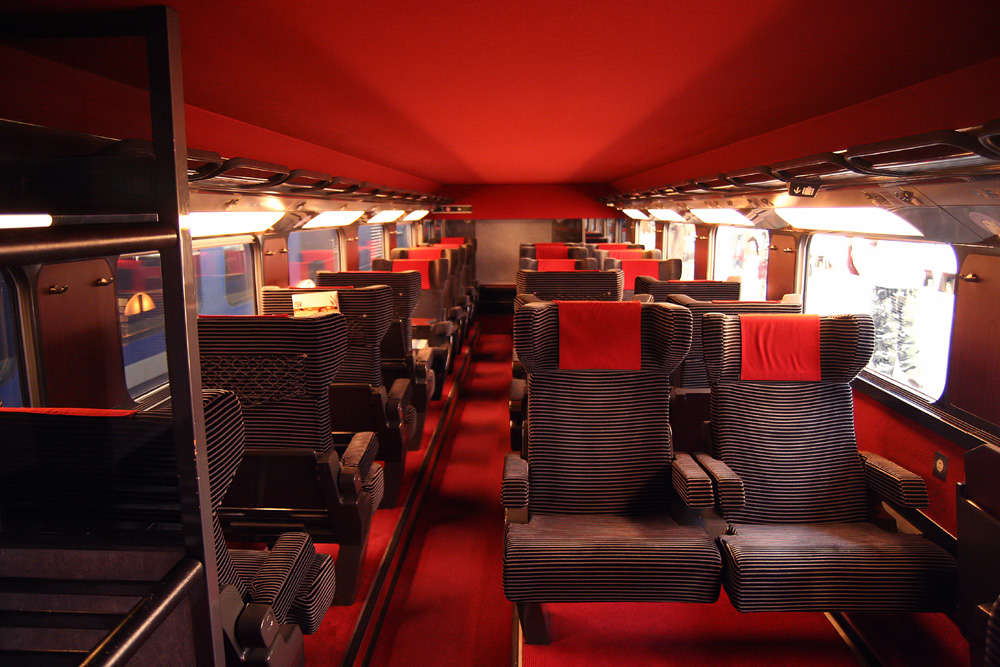
- First class on a TGV Duplex
- In service: 1995–present
- Manufacturer: Alstom
- Family name: TGV
- Constructed: 1995–2023
- Number built: 160 trainsets total: 89 Duplex; 19 Réseau Duplex/POS Duplex; 50 Dasye
- Formation: 2 power cars + 8 passenger cars
- Fleet numbers: 201–289 (Duplex); 601–619 (Réseau Duplex); 710–720, 760-797 (Dasye); 721-739 (POS Duplex)
- Capacity: 510 seats (182 first class, 328 second class); 644 seats (all second class)
- Operator: SNCF

Specifications
- Train length: 200 m (656 ft 2 in)
- Width: 2,896 mm (9 ft 6.0 in)
- Height: 4,303 mm (14 ft 1.4 in)
- Doors: 1 per side, per car
- Maximum speed: 320 km/h (200 mph)
- Weight: 380 t (374 long tons; 419 short tons)
- Traction system: Duplex: Alstom GTO thyristor control; Dasye: Alstom IGBT–VVVF
- Traction motors: Duplex: 8 × Alstom SM 47 1,100 kW (1,475 hp) 3-phase AC synchronous motor; Dasye: 8 × Alstom 6 FHA 1,160 kW (1,556 hp) 3-phase AC asynchronous motor
- Power output: 3,680 kW (4,935 hp) (DC); 8,800 kW (11,801 hp) (Duplex, AC); 9,280 kW (12,445 hp) (Dasye, AC)
- Electric systems: Overhead line: 25 kV 50 Hz AC; 1,500 V DC
- Current collection: Pantograph
- UIC classification: Bo′Bo′+2′(2)′(2)′(2)′(2)′(2)′(2)′(2)′2′+Bo′Bo′
- Braking systems: Regenerative, pneumatic
- Safety systems: Duplex: TVM-430, KVB; Dasye: ERTMS, TVM-430, KVB
- Multiple working: Up to two units (3 on maintenance)
- Track gauge: 1,435 mm (4 ft 8 1/2 in) standard gauge

The TGV Duplex is a French high-speed train of the TGV family, manufactured by Alstom, and operated by the French national railway company SNCF. They were the first TGV trainsets to use bi-level passenger carriages with a seating capacity of 508 passengers, increasing capacity on busy high-speed lines. While the TGV Duplex started as a small component of the TGV fleet, it has become one of the system's workhorses.

A total of 160 Duplex trainsets were built: the original order of 89 first constructed in 1995, an additional 19 Réseau Duplex trainsets created as an extension of the TGV POS project in 2006, and 52 second-generation Dasye trainsets were first delivered in 2007 with revised traction motors and safety systems.

The Duplex design was further refined into the third generation Euroduplex.

== Purpose ==
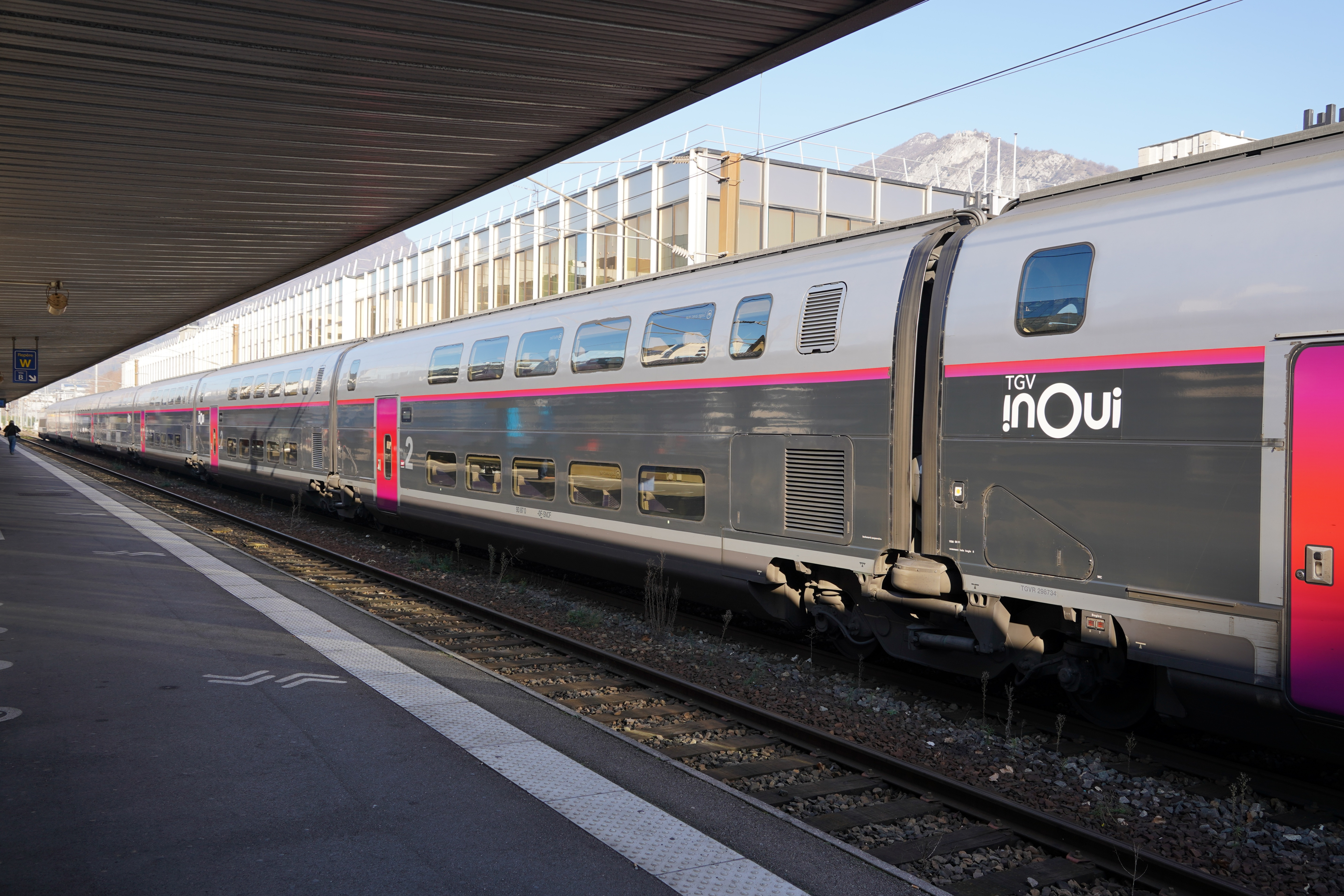
Bi-level carriages allow 45% more capacity than in a single level TGV.

The LGV Sud-Est from Paris to Lyon is the busiest high-speed line in France. After its opening in 1981 it rapidly reached capacity. Several options were available to increase capacity. The separation between trains was reduced to three minutes on some TGV lines, but the increasingly complex signalling systems, and high-performance brakes (to reduce braking distance) required, limited this option. Another option is to widen the train but is generally not practicable due to loading gauge restrictions. Running two trainsets coupled together in multiple-unit (MU) configuration provides extra capacity, but required very long station platforms. Given length and width restrictions, the remaining option is to adopt a bi-level configuration, with seating on two levels, adding 45% more passenger capacity. TGV Duplex sets are often run with a single deck Réseau set or another Duplex set.

== History ==
The Duplex feasibility study was completed in 1987. In 1988, a full-scale mockup was built to gauge customer reactions to the bi-level concept, traditionally associated with commuter and regional rail rather than with high-speed intercity trains. A TGV Sud-Est trailer was tested in revenue service with the inside furnished to simulate the lower floor of a bi-level arrangement, and later that year another TGV Sud-Est was modified to study the dynamic behavior of a train with a higher center of gravity. Discussions with GEC-Alstom began soon after, and in July 1990 the company won the contract to build the "TGV-2N", as it was then known. The contract was finalized in early 1991, at which point the official order was made. The first tests of a bi-level trainset were in November 1994. Soon after their first run, the first rake of eight trailers was tested at 290 km/h (180 mph) on the Sud-Est line. The trainset was powered by TGV Réseau power cars at the time, as the Duplex power cars were not ready. The first Duplex power car was mated to the bi-level trailers on 21 June 1995.

In 2007, a shortened TGV Duplex trainset equipped with distributed traction technology, called the AGV, set a rail speed record of 574.8 km/h (357.2 mph) during test runs.

== Innovations ==
The Duplex design introduced a number of technical changes relative to earlier single-level TGV trainsets. A comparison between the original TGV Sud-Est and a Duplex trainset illustrates differences in power-to-weight ratio and weight per seat:

	Power-to-weight ratio (kW/tonne)	Weight per seat (tonne)	Power per seat (kW)
TGV Sud-Est	17	1.10	18.34
TGV Duplex	23	0.7	16.15

In this comparison, "power" refers to installed power rather than the power typically used during operation.

Several design features contributed to these differences:

- Carbody construction: French high-speed lines have an axle load limit of 17 tonnes (37,000 lb). To remain within this constraint for double-deck rolling stock, Alstom made extensive use of extruded aluminium in the carbody structure to reduce weight.
- Aerodynamic refinements: Modifications to the nose of the power units and the inter-car gaps reduced aerodynamic drag. At a cruising speed of 300 km/h (190 mph), a Duplex trainset experiences approximately 4% more drag than a single-level TGV. The nose design differed from the original Sud-Est profile and was styled by industrial designer Roger Tallon.
- Crashworthiness: The design incorporates crush zones and reinforced passenger compartments. The power unit frame is designed to withstand a steady-state frontal load of 500 tonnes (1,100,000 lb) and includes structural elements intended to absorb impact energy.
- Pantograph system: Duplex trainsets use the Faiveley CX pantograph, which incorporates pneumatically actuated active control. Gas cylinders within the arm assembly allow adjustment of stiffness to maintain contact with the overhead line across a range of operating speeds.
- Braking system: Unlike earlier TGV trainsets, which used disc brakes only on unpowered axles, the Duplex design includes disc brakes on powered axles. These are mounted directly on the wheels, replacing tread brakes and reducing wheel tread wear and rolling noise.
- Auxiliary equipment noise reduction: Cooling fans for the power units, located in the roof, were redesigned to reduce noise levels when trains are stopped in stations.

In addition, on Duplex trainsets the lower level of the bar car is used to house equipment, freeing space on the upper level for passenger accommodation.

== Réseau Duplex ==
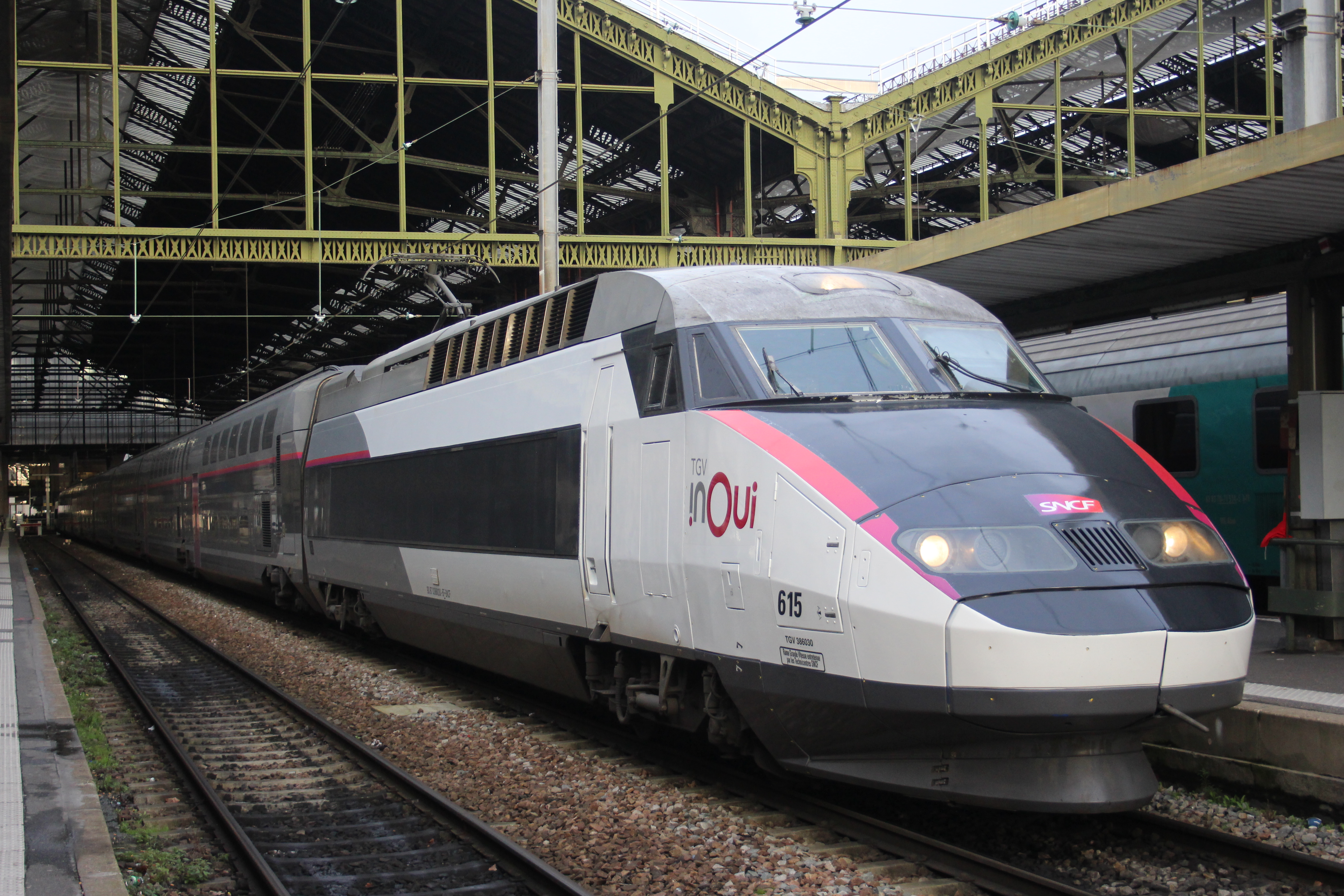
SNCF TGV inOui Reseau Duplex at Gare de Lyon

The Réseau Duplex was developed as part of the TGV POS program as a variant of the TGV Duplex fleet. As part of this program, Alstom delivered 38 new tri-current power cars and 19 sets of double-deck Duplex passenger coaches to SNCF in 2006.

To form the Réseau Duplex trainsets, the new Duplex passenger coaches were paired with 38 existing dual-current power cars from the original TGV Réseau fleet. At the same time, the newly delivered tri-current power cars were coupled with 19 sets of single-level Réseau passenger coaches, creating hybrid TGV POS trainsets for international services.

The tri-current configuration was required for operation on the LGV Est, which connects with the German rail network electrified at 15 kV 16.7 Hz AC. Meanwhile, the double-deck Duplex coaches on increased seating capacity on high-demand domestic routes.

This arrangement allowed tri-current trainsets to be introduced in time for the opening of the LGV Est without delaying deliveries of Duplex equipment.

Since 2023, TGV POS and Réseau Duplex trainsets have been undergoing rebuilding programs, resulting in reconfigured TGV Réseau and TGV POS Duplex trainsets. The TGV POS Duplex is rebuilt using power cars from former TGV POS sets and passenger coaches from the TGV Réseau Duplex fleet; from 2019 onward, the 15 kV AC electrical equipment was removed from the POS power cars. The 19 TGV POS Duplex sets are being refurbished for domestic service in France under the inOui and Ouigo brands.

== Dasye ==
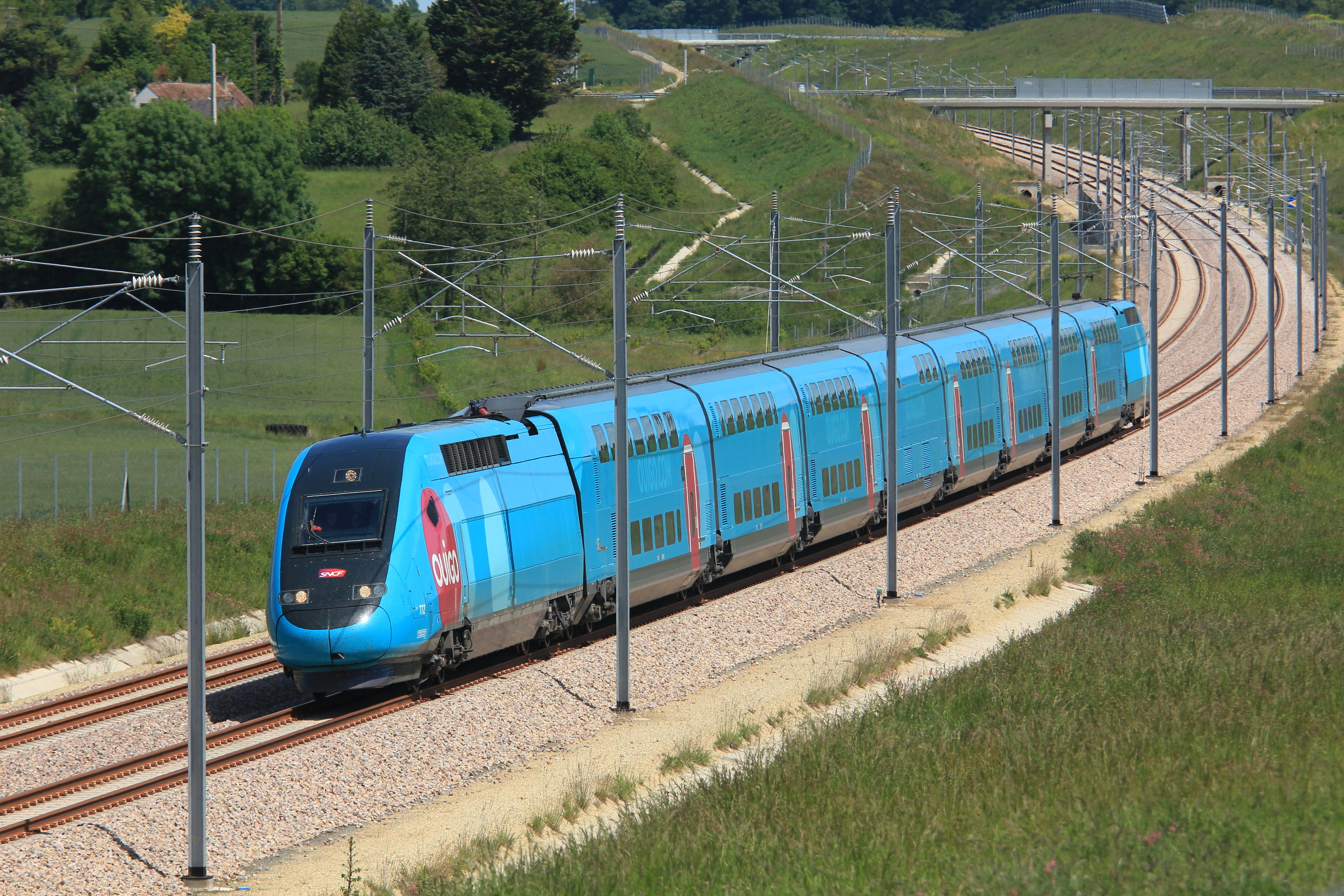
Dasye trainset operated by Ouigo

Dasye is a contraction of Duplex Asynchronous ERTMS and refers to the second generation of TGV Duplex trainsets. The exterior design and passenger accommodation are largely similar to those of the first-generation Duplex trains. The primary technical differences are found in the power cars. These include the use of asynchronous motors, first used on the Eurostar e300 trainsets, which allow an individual motor within a bogie to be isolated in the event of a failure, and the installation of the European Rail Traffic Management System (ERTMS).

A total of 50 Dasye trainsets were ordered. A prototype power car was delivered in late 2006 for testing, and the type entered commercial service on 14 February 2008.

From 2013, a number of Dasye trainsets were reconfigured for use on SNCF's low-cost Ouigo service. These sets use a high-density seating layout with a capacity of 644 passengers, compared with 510 on a standard configuration. The increase in capacity results from the removal of the bar car and first-class accommodation, along with the use of slimline seating. By 2024, 38 Dasye trainsets had been converted for Ouigo service, with further conversions planned through 2027.

One Dasye trainset, number 744, was destroyed in the Eckwersheim derailment on 14 November 2015.

== Eurotrain ==
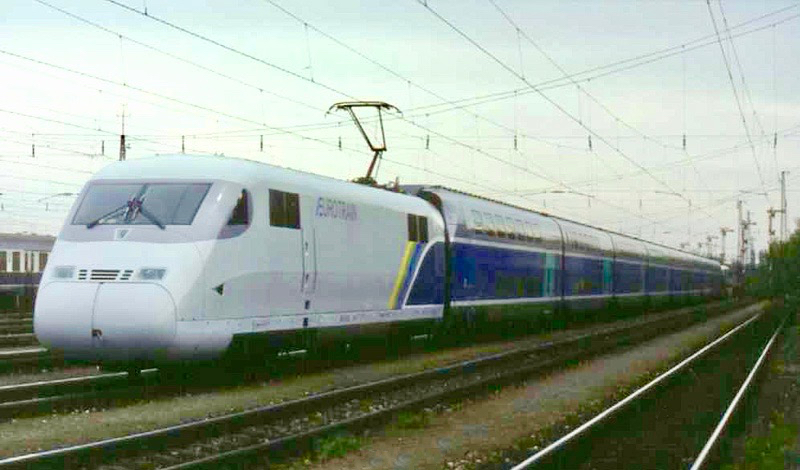
The Eurotrain demonstration train at Munich-Laim on 4 April 1998

Eurotrain was a consortium formed by Siemens and GEC-Alsthom (today Alstom) in 1996 to market high-speed rail technology in Asia. In 1997, it was one of two competitors to supply the core system of Taiwan High Speed Rail (THSR), and was awarded the status of preferred bidder by concessionaire THSRC.

In early 1998, the consortium created a demonstration train by combining cars of three existing French and German high-speed trains: the intermediate cars of TGV Duplex trainset #224 was joined with German Railways ICE 2 powerheads 402 042 and 402 046 at the two ends. On 4 May 1998, the Eurotrain demonstration train made a presentation run on the Hanover–Würzburg high-speed railway in Germany, achieving a maximum speed of 316 km/h (196 mph).

In December 2000, THSRC awarded the contract to the rival Taiwan Shinkansen Consortium, leading to a legal battle ending in damage payments for Eurotrain in 2004.

== See also ==
- List of high speed trains
- TGV M
- TGV POS
- Thalys
- Eurotrain
