= TGV Lyria =

High-speed rail service between France and Switzerland

- Logo used since 2017

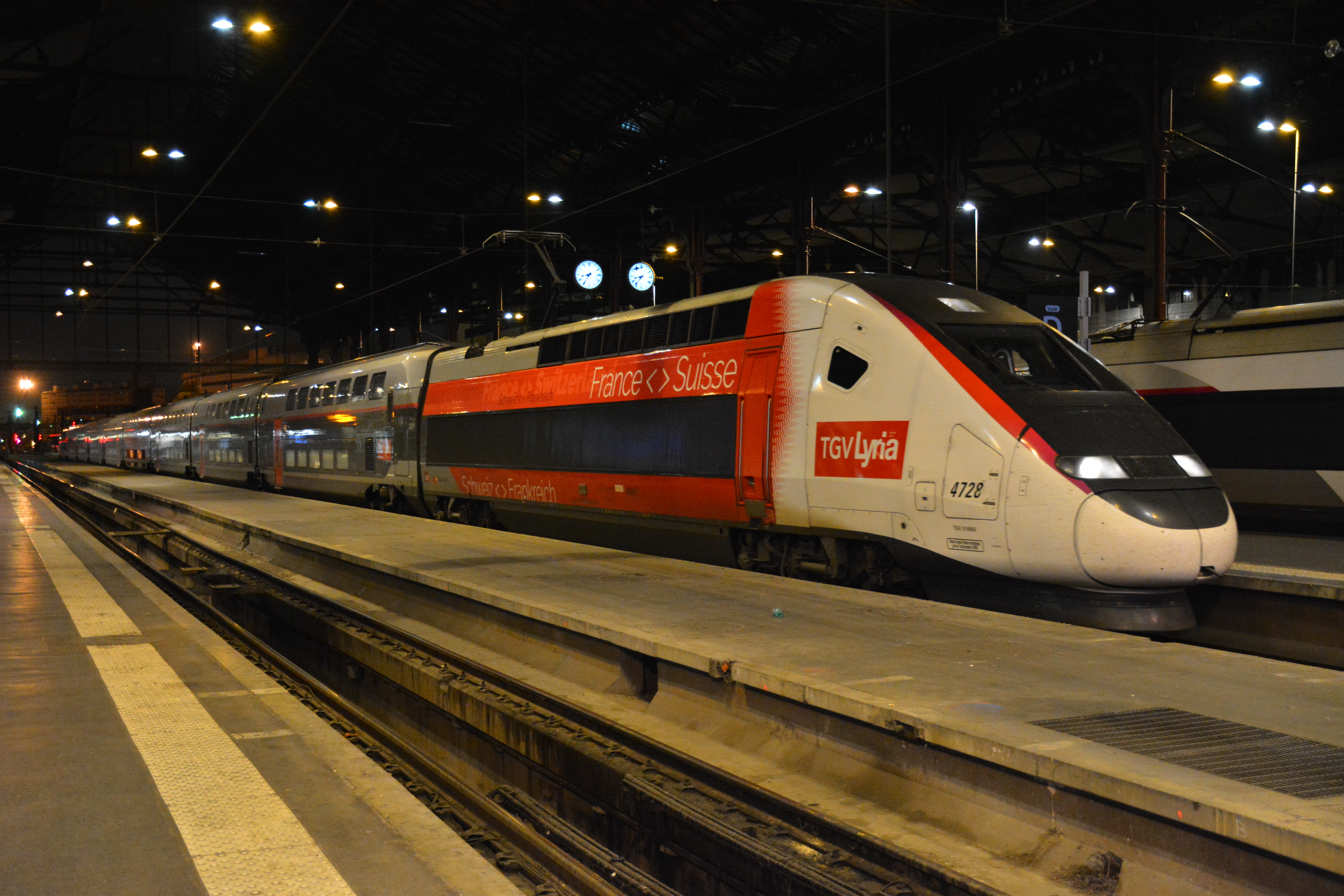
- TGV 2N2 at the Gare de Lyon in Paris
- Trade name: TGV Lyria
- Formerly: "Ligne de Cœur"
- Type: Simplified joint-stock company
- Industry: Rail operation
- Predecessor: Trans Europ Express
- Founded: 23 May 1993; 33 years ago
- Headquarters: 25 rue Titon; 75011, Paris, France
- Area served: France and Switzerland
- Key people: Fabien Soulet (CEO)
- Revenue: ▲EUR 340,000 (2014)
- Owner: SNCF Voyages Développement (74 %); SBB CFF FFS (26%)
- Parent: SNCF and CFF
- Annual ridership: 5.7 million passengers (2025)
- Website: www.tgv-lyria.com
- Footnotes; The revenue was ▲280 million € (2011) and ▲260 million € (2010)

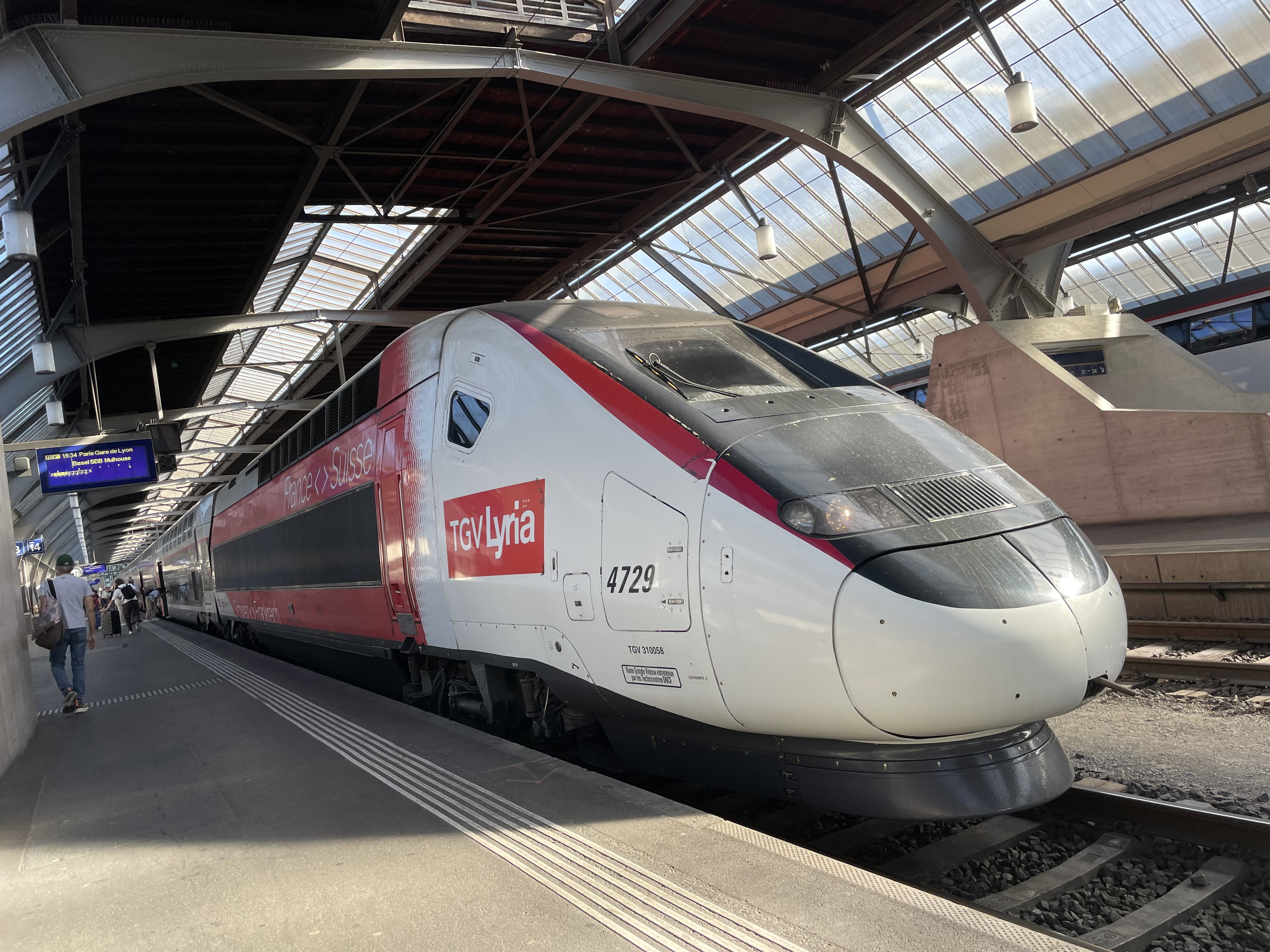
TGV 2N2 4729 stationed at Zurich HB headed to Paris Gare de Lyon

TGV Lyria, owned by SNCF Voyages Développement and Swiss Federal Railways, and jointly operated by SNCF Voyageurs and Swiss Federal Railways, is the brand name used for TGV railway lines connecting France and Switzerland. TGV Lyria is also a corporation that runs the service operated by SNCF Voyageurs in France and Swiss Federal Railways in Switzerland. Each train has one French and one Swiss train manager on the whole journey.

== Corporate status ==
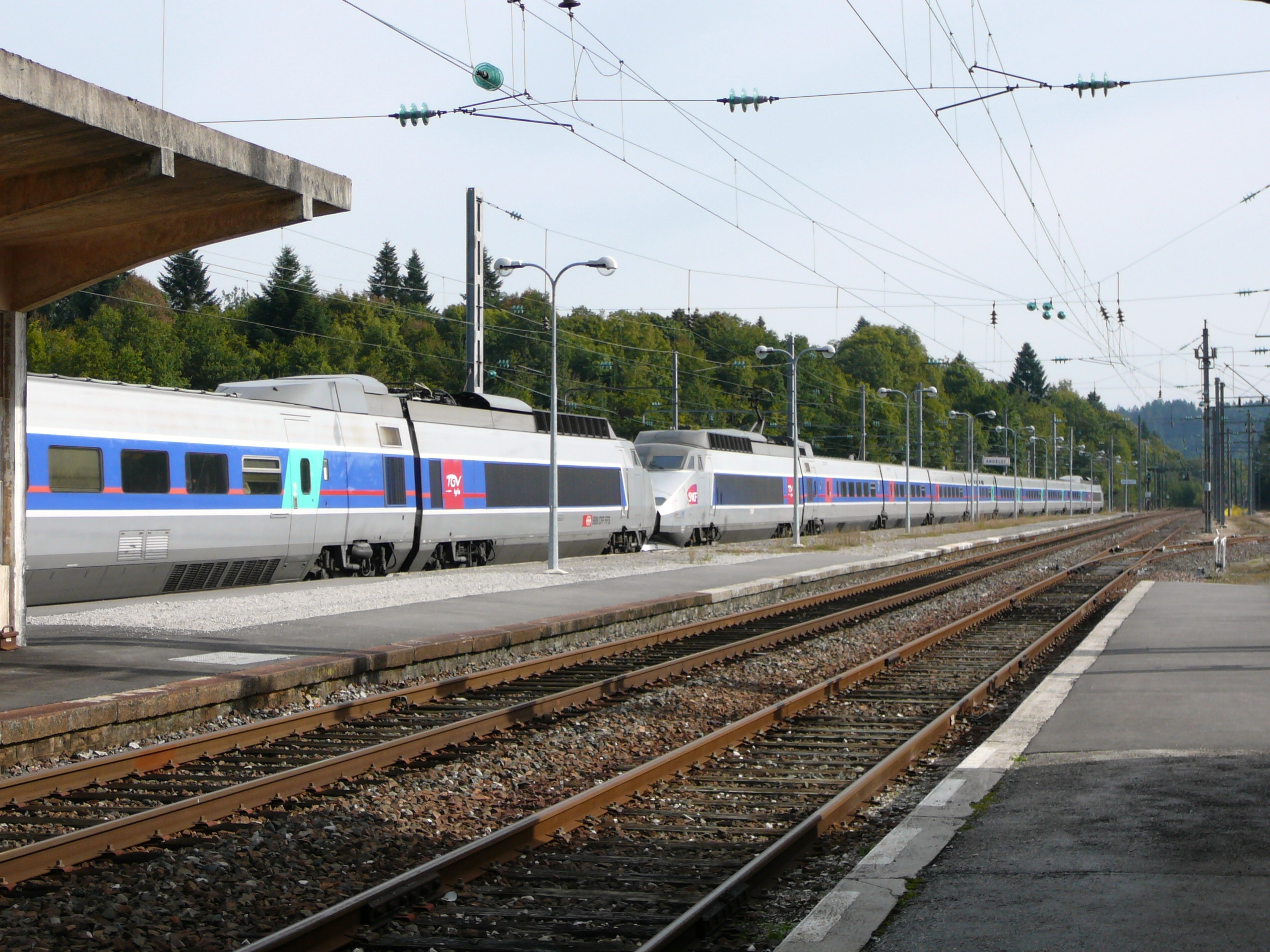
Lyria TGV Sud-Est in original grey and blue TGV livery

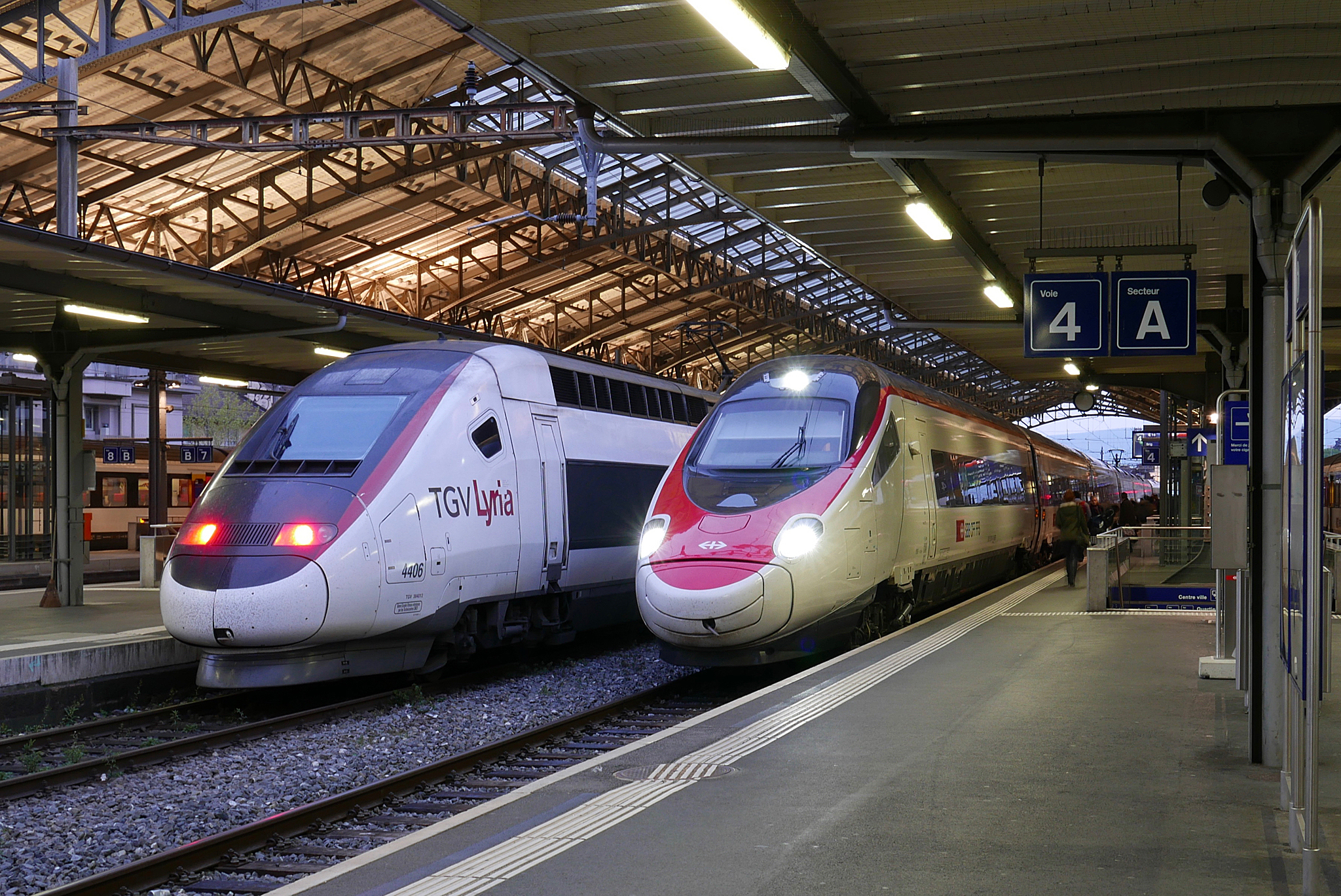
A TGV Lyria POS train in Lausanne alongside a RABe 503 EC35

Initially, the corporation was a groupement d'intérêt économique (GIE: "group of (shared) economic interest") between SNCF and Swiss Federal Railways whose goal was the creation of a TGV service between Gare de Lyon (Paris) and Lausanne/Bern. Today, the corporation is officially a limited company according to French law (Société par actions simplifiée / SAS). SNCF Voyages Développement owns 74% of the capital, with Swiss Federal Railways holding the remaining 26%.

== History ==
Starting in mid-1961, the route between Paris and Lausanne was operated by the Trans Europ Express Cisalpin trains, which continued on to Milan. On 22 January 1984 this service was replaced by a new TGV service with tri-current locomotives, though service was cut back to Lausanne. In the spirit of the previous European expresses, the trains were christened with names: Champs-Élysées, Lemano, Lutetia and Cisalpin. On 31 May 1987 the train service was rebranded as EuroCity. By this time, a service to Bern was in place as well.

The GIE was created for the first time on 23 May 1993, to operate the segments between Paris and Lausanne/Bern. Service to Geneva was not covered at that time. During the winter of 1995–1996, a single roundtrip per day was extended from Lausanne to Brig to stop at stations serving ski resorts in the Rhône Valley. As was the case with other trains with similar service, these trains were branded as TGV des Neiges. On 28 September 1997 the service was slightly reorganized and rebranded as Ligne de Cœur, with new livery applied to the rolling stock. On 4 March 2002 the name Lyria was applied for the first time to the service. The name then slowly came to stand for all TGV services between France and Switzerland and was applied to Paris–Geneva trains around January 2005. Service to Geneva had existed as part of LGV Sud-Est since 1981.^{,}

At the end of 2005, Lyria transported its 3 millionth passenger.

After the opening of the LGV Est in June 2007, Lyria service between Paris and Zurich began using the newly constructed line instead of the previous route, passing through Strasbourg, Colmar, Mulhouse and Basel. Consequently, service from Paris departed from Gare de l'Est instead of Gare de Lyon until 2011.^{,}

In February 2011, service improvements were announced, with a fleet of 19 TGV POS trains offering increased frequencies.

Since 12 December 2010, the travel time on the Paris–Geneva line has improved with the reconstruction of the Haut-Bugey line, which connects Bourg-en-Bresse and Bellegarde-sur-Valserine. Until then, only the western part of the line was open (up to Oyonnax), and the project has restored the entire length of the line. Travel time between Paris and Geneva reduced by 30 minutes, to 3 hours and 5 minutes, and track capacity was also increased, allowing nine trains each way per day instead of the previous seven.^{,}

In 2011, with the completion of the LGV Rhin-Rhône, travel time between Paris and Basel/Zurich was reduced by 30 minutes, passing through Dijon, Mulhouse and Basel. The departure station in Paris returned to Gare de Lyon.

== Visual identity ==
The service, first called «Ligne de Cœur» was part of the TGV network originally. The logo evolved as the name Lyria appeared, and as the TGV logo changed. The TGV Lyria trains, originally in the blue and grey TGV livery with an additional red band through the train and the TGV Lyria logo on the bar coaches and the power cars, were re-liveried in 2012 with a variation of the new «Carmillon» TGV livery, except the doors which were repainted in brown instead of the pink present on the re-liveried TGVs and other re-liveried SNCF rolling stock.

Evolution of the TGV Lyria logos

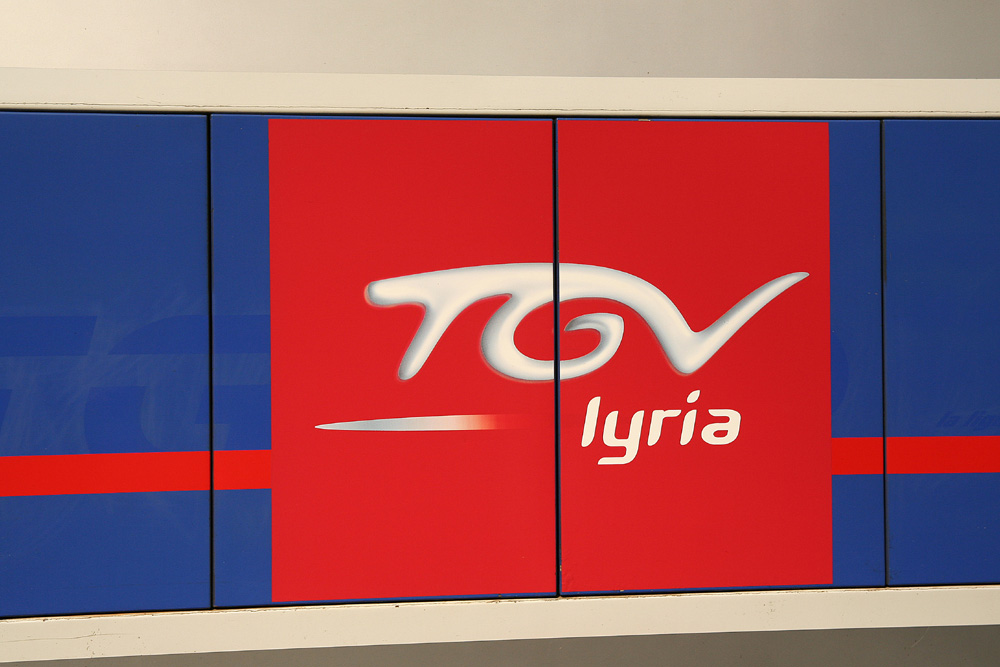
First TGV Lyria logo

from June 2009 to 2011

2011-2017

since 2017

== Current services ==
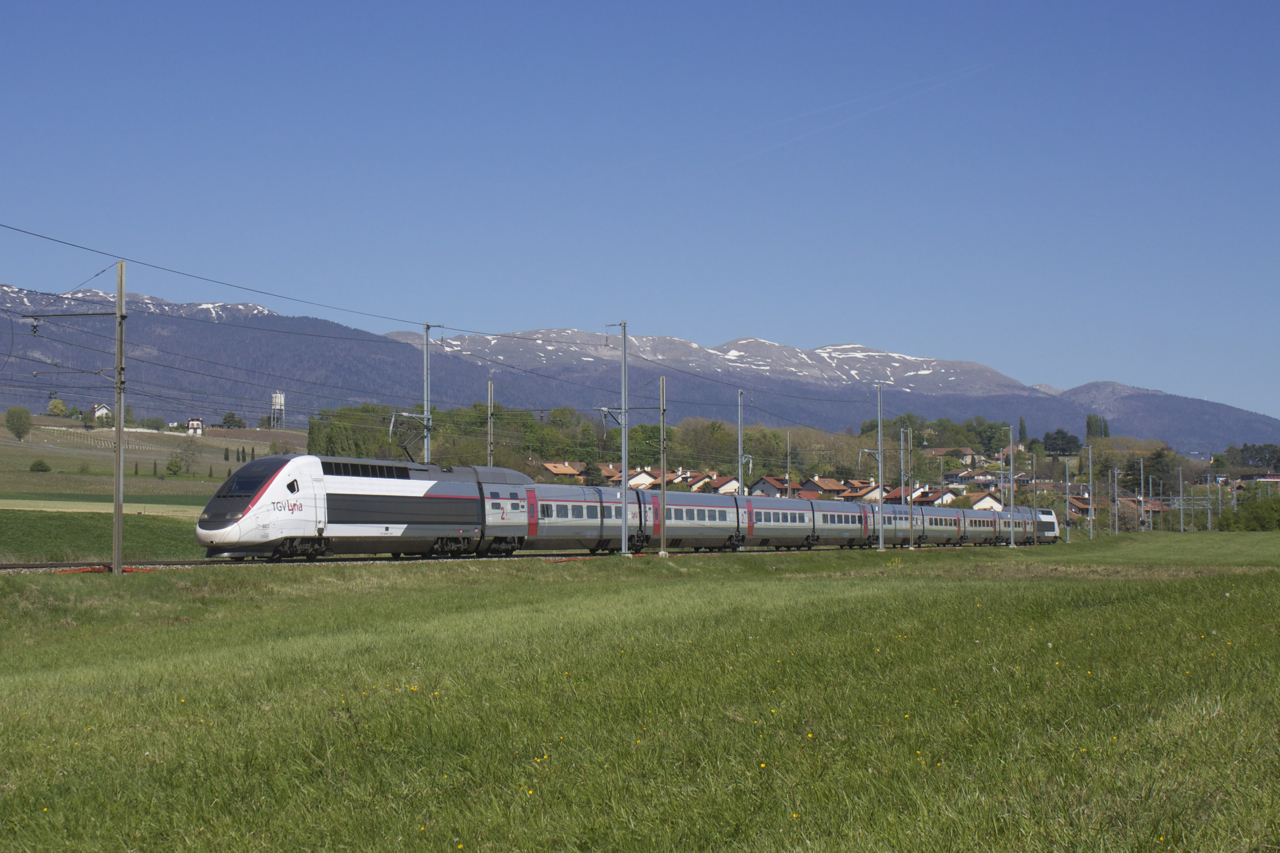
TGV Lyria POS train at Satigny, Switzerland

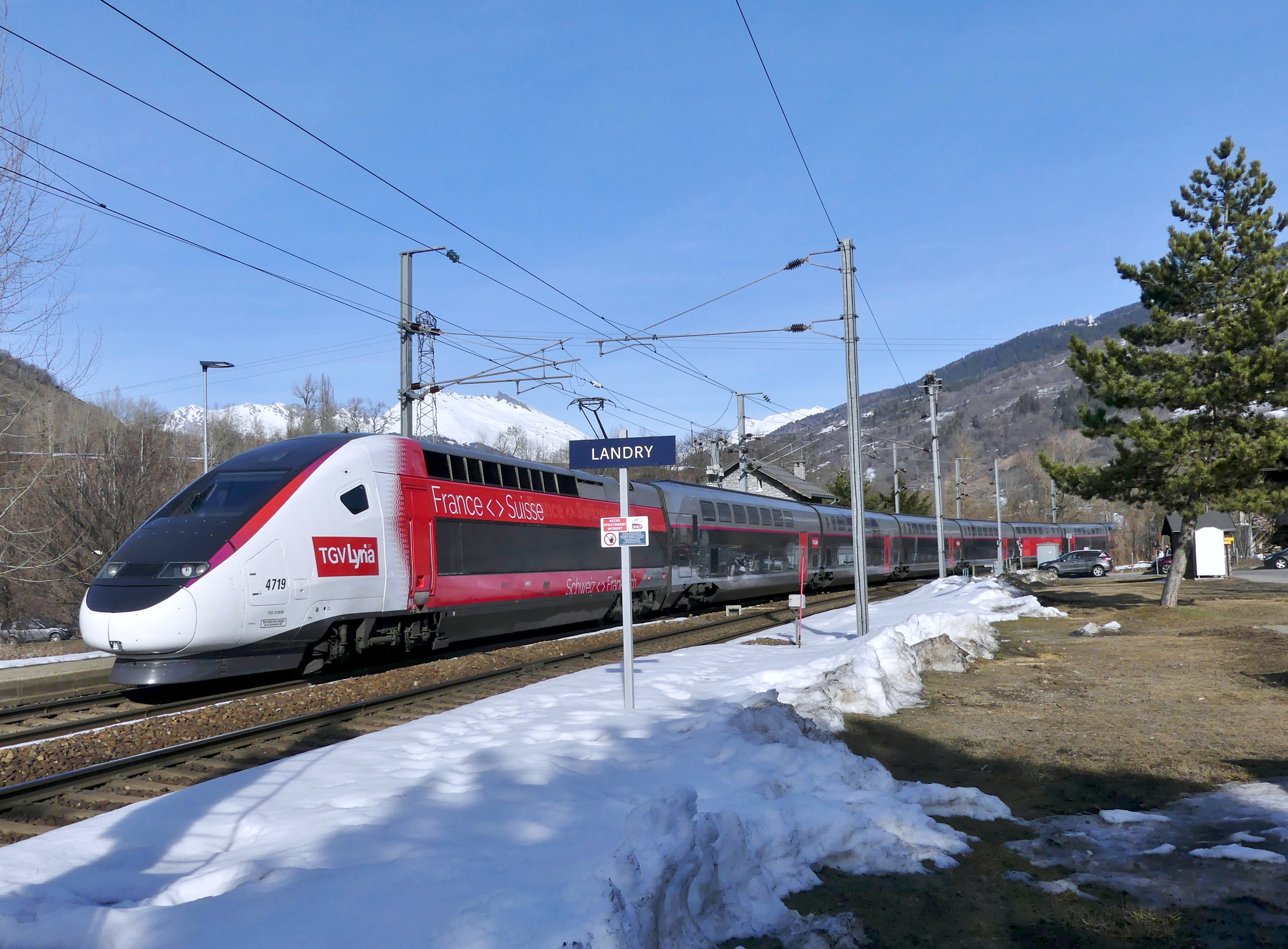
New TGV Lyria Euroduplex train at Landry, Savoie, France

As of 2026, TGV Lyria runs the following routes:

Route	Frequency
Lausanne – Genève-Cornavin – Marseille-St-Charles	5 roundtrips per week (in summer months); travel time 4 h 26 min from Marseille
Genève-Cornavin – Paris Gare de Lyon	Up to 8 roundtrips per day; minimal travel time 3 h 14 min
Lausanne – Genève-Cornavin – Paris Gare de Lyon	3 roundtrips per day; minimal travel time 3 h 43 min
Zürich HB – Basel SBB – Mulhouse – Paris Gare de Lyon	6 round trips per day; travel time 4 h 4 min from Zürich and 3 h 4 min from Basel

== Rolling stock ==
TGV Sud-Est tri-current trains were originally used for the route between Paris and Lausanne, Bern, and Zurich, with 7 trains owned by SNCF and 2 owned by CFF (train nos. 112 & 114). In summer 2006, all trains were renovated to offer a better quality of service.

Services to Geneva were operated using bi-current TGV Sud-Est sets. Trains, with the exception of those running to Geneva, used to carry the Ligne de cœur logo; this was gradually replaced in 2006 with the TGV Lyria logo and only the old red-border livery remains. The CFF logo was also added to their cars during April 2006.

From the opening of the LGV Est in 2007, service to Basel/Zurich was run by the new TGV POS as well as renovated TGV Réseau trains, replacing the Sud-Est sets.

In 2012, SNCF transferred the totality of the TGV POS fleet to Lyria.

In 2019 Lyria replaced the single-deck POS trains (355 seats) with 15 double-deck TGV 2N2 (507 seats), increasing seat capacity by 30%.

== See also ==
- Rail transport in France
- Rail transport in Switzerland
