= Eurotrain =

Planned high-speed rail project by Siemens and Alstom

Eurotrain was a joint venture formed by Siemens and GEC-Alstom to market high-speed rail technology in Asia. In 1997 it was one of two competitors to supply the core system of Taiwan High Speed Rail (THSR), and it was awarded the status of preferred bidder by concessionaire THSRC. Eurotrain assembled a demonstration train, but later THSRC decided to award the contract to a rival consortium, leading to a legal battle ending in damage payments for Eurotrain in 2004.

== Origins ==
Eurotrain was a joint venture of Siemens (the main maker of the German ICE) and GEC-Alsthom (the main maker of the French TGV), formed in March 1996 with the aim to pool their high-speed rail technologies and market it jointly in Asia. The companies wanted to avoid a repeat of a competitive battle they had for Korea's KTX, which resulted in a loss for Siemens and limited benefits for victorious GEC-Alsthom. GEC-Alsthom held 60% and Siemens held 40% in the joint venture. The first and only high-speed project Eurotrain was involved in was THSR.

== Participation in the bidding for THSR ==
=== Initial success ===
THSR was realised as a Build-Operate-Transfer (BOT) project, but Eurotrain was already involved at the stage of the bidding for the BOT franchise. The bids of the two rival consortia were both based on specific high-speed rail technology platforms: Taiwan High Speed Rail Consortium (THSRC) allied with Eurotrain, while the rival Chunghwa High Speed Rail Consortium (CHSRC) allied with Taiwan Shinkansen Consortium (TSC), which offered Japanese Shinkansen technology. On 25 September 1997, THSRC (later renamed Taiwan High Speed Rail Corporation with the same acronym) was selected as preferred bidder.

Also in 1997, THSRC declared Eurotrain the preferred bidder to supply the core technology, which included the high-speed trains, track, electrification, signalling and communication.

During the final negotiations, THSRC and Eurotrain sought to convince BOHSR about the technical viability of their offer by staging a demonstration run with a hybrid train assembled specifically for this purpose (see Demonstration train).

The Eschede train disaster on 3 June 1998 didn't reduce THSRC's chances: although BOHSR wanted detailed information from Germany about the causes of the accident, it recognised that Eurotrain's train type in the THSRC offer did not use the wheel type the break of which was the root cause of the derailment. THSRC finally signed the agreement about the BOT contract with the government on 23 July 1998.

==== Demonstration train ====
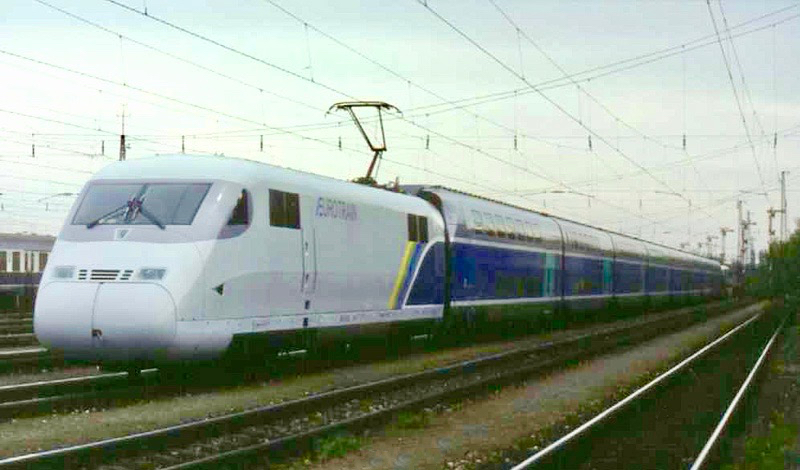
The Eurotrain demonstration train at Munich-Laim on 4 April 1998.

To meet THSRC's high capacity requirements, Alstom and Siemens planned to create a hybrid train type that combines the lighter and higher capacity TGV Duplex articulated double-deck intermediate cars, extended from 8 to 12 cars, with the more powerful powerheads of German Railways (DB) ICE 2 high-speed trains.

In early 1998, the two companies created a demonstration train by combining cars of three existing French and German high-speed trains: ICE 2 powerheads DB 402 042-6 and 402 046-7 and the intermediate cars of TGV Duplex trainset #224.

The three components of the demonstration train were adapted separately at Siemens's Duewag plant in Uerdingen, Germany and GEC-Alsthom's plant in La Rochelle, France, in March 1998. Adaptations included the connection on the ICE 2 powerheads to the roof-mounted high-voltage cable along the TGV trainset, the installation of electronic and optical cables for the ICE drive control electronics on the roof of the TGV trainset, the installation of a rectifier on a TGV car for the on-board electricity, and the replacement of the automatic coupler on the ICE 2 powerheads with side buffers and standard UIC coupler. Braking systems weren't adapted, only pneumatic braking was used. The ICE 2 powerheads also received a special livery to harmonise with that of the TGV Duplex set.

The train was assembled in Munich in early April 1998, followed by static and quasi-static tests. Then, between 25 and 30 April 1998, the train conducted test runs with speeds of up to 310 km/h on the Hanover–Würzburg high-speed railway and the line from Hannover to Minden, to measure running stability, ride comfort, pressure during tunnel crossings, and pass-by noise.

On 3 May 1998, the Eurotrain demonstration train was presented to the public in Hamburg. The next day, on 4 May 1998, the train made a presentation run from Göttingen to Hannover with THSRC and BOHSR representatives present, achieving a maximum speed of 316 km/h.

=== Departure from the project ===
THSRC had difficulty raising capital for the project. In May 1999, the government of Japan promised soft loans if THSRC switched to TSC, Liu Tai-ying, head of the China Development Corp. and also the head of the losing CHSRC bid, who was the top financier of the governing Kuomintang, promised funds, too. In light of these offers, in May 1999, THSRC signalled that the selection of the core system supplier is still open, and formally relaunched a tender on 15 June 1999.

To balance the perceived financial advantages of the TSC offer, Eurotrain offered to take a 10% stake in THSRC in September 1999. (The next year, TSC, too, would sign an agreement to buy a 10% stake in THSRC.) The competitors also received public government backing for their offers. While the Japanese government supported TSC with the above-mentioned promise of loans, a letter from the European Union's Trade Commission to Taiwan's government expressed Europe-wide support for Eurotrain. A visit by France's Transport Minister was only called off in the wake of the Taiwan frigates kickback scandal, leading to rumours that Eurotrain may have links to the lobby group at the centre of the scandal. However, further ministerial visits from both France and Germany were planned before the decision came.

THSRC announced on 28 December 1999 that it would negotiate a final contract with the Taiwan Shinkansen Consortium, saying that while both trains were satisfactory, TSC had "technology, price, finance and maintenance merits". THSRC emphasized that expectations on exchange rate fluctuations played a role, but also noted that TSC offered a newer Shinkansen than they had in 1997.

It was rumoured that the decision for TSC over Eurotrain was political: according to Taiwanese media, the choice was made to pave the way for then-President Lee Teng-hui's visit to Japan. THSRC denied the allegations. However, in a book published earlier in May 1999, Lee made a case for picking the Japanese offer, claiming that while it was more expensive, the Shinkansen was superior based on safety and political considerations.

=== Legal battle ===
The losing Eurotrain consortium interpreted the terms of its earlier preferred bidder status as a binding agreement that THSRC violated by starting negotiations with TSC, and filed an injunction against it. On behalf of Eurotrain, Siemens chairman Heinrich von Pierer also lobbied President Lee Teng-hui for intervention, but was rejected. The German, French, and British trade offices also questioned THSRC's chairwoman. Eurotrain lost the injunction case both on the initial filing and at the appeal in the High Court.

While Eurotrain eventually conceded the train system bid, it filed a US$800 million damage claim at the Singapore International Arbitration Centre in February 2001. In response, THSRC contended that their decision was a commercial one, reiterating that "price, financial planning, and maintenance" were the only deciding factors. After a lengthy arbitration process, the court ruled in March 2004 that THSRC should pay a compensation for the US$32.4 million Eurotrain spent on development and US$35.7 million for unjust enrichment. THSRC agreed to pay US$65 million (US$89 million with interest) to Eurotrain in November 2004.

=== Legacy ===
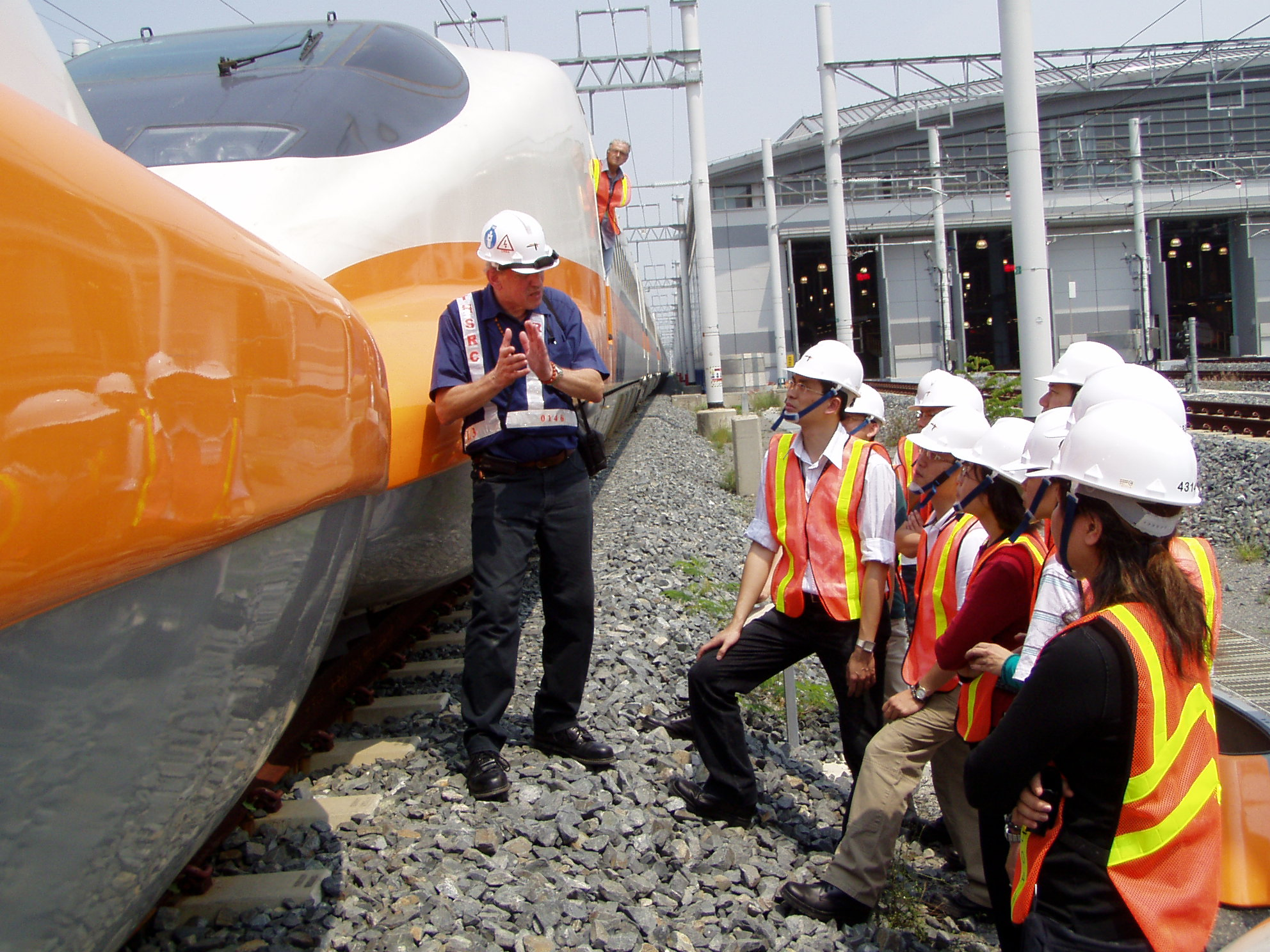
A French driver and a French instructor demonstrate and explain train coupling to Taiwanese conductor trainees in September 2006.

THSRC's working with Eurotrain resulted in the use of European high-speed rail technology or specialists in some fields.

- THSRC adopted European specifications for superstructure, with a larger cross-sectional area and higher bridge strength than what was standard on Shinkansen lines.
- THSRC also prescribed European stability standards for railway track constructed by Japanese companies.
- THSRC planned for bi-directional operation on the two tracks as common in Europe, in contrast with strictly uni-directional tracks in Japan, forcing TSC to develop a new automatic train control (ATC) system.
- Also for bi-directional operation, a German manufacturer supplied high-speed swing-nose switches on ballastless slab track.
- The supplier of the Environmental Control System, which monitors and controls devices and external factors and connects to the communication system, used Siemens equipment. In July 2010, after failing to solve a persistent problem with end position detectors that caused switch malfunctions, THSRC asked Siemens to help find the root cause.
- THSR started operation of its Japanese-built trains with 40 French and 13 German drivers. THSRC planned to train enough local drivers to replace them in 18 months.

== Demise ==
Although in the nineties, Eurotrain seriously considered to participate in the expected competition for the Beijing–Shanghai high-speed railway, the constituent companies didn't pursue the joint venture further, and competed for further contracts separately.

After a meeting on 17 December 1999, freshly installed DB CEO Hartmut Mehdorn and SNCF CEO Louis Gallois called on the European rail industry to create a joint high-speed train platform, to realise economies of scale. DB's spokesman argued that if it is possible for German and French companies to jointly offer Eurotrain in Taiwan, the same should be possible in Europe.

The proposal, dubbed Euro-Train by the media, was taken up as a joint project of European state railways and train producers, with Eurotrain constituents Alstom and Siemens remaining the only industry partners in the project by September 2000. The project was officially named Highspeed Train Europe (HTE), and Italy's state railway FS was won as additional partner. However, after the evaluation of 10,000 detail questions, 500 remained in which the partners couldn't compromise, and the HTE project was abandoned in September 2004.
