= SNCF TGV La Poste =

French high-speed mail trainset

TGV La Poste
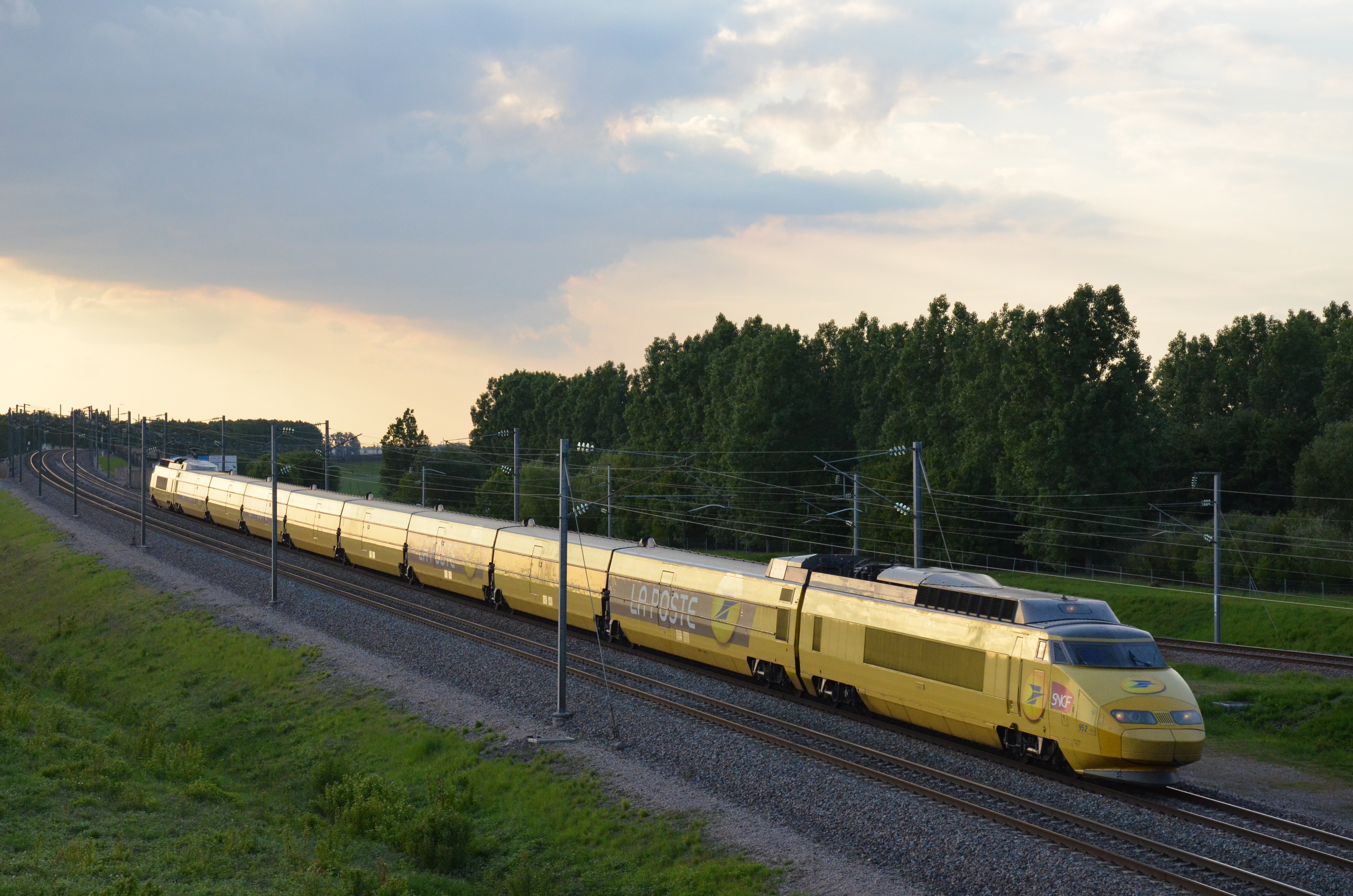
- TGV La Poste trainset
- In service: 1984- 27 June 2015
- Manufacturer: GEC-Alsthom
- Family name: TGV
- Number built: 2 1/2 (new) + 1 (converted)
- Number preserved: 0
- Number scrapped: 7
- Formation: 10 cars (2 power cars, 8 postal cars)
- Operator: SNCF for La Poste

Specifications
- Train length: 200 m (656 ft 2 in)
- Width: 2.904 m (9 ft 6.3 in)
- Maximum speed: 270 km/h (168 mph)
- Power output: 6,800 kW (9,119 hp) @ 25 kV
- Electric systems: Overhead line: 25 kV 50 Hz AC; 1,500 V DC
- Current collection: Pantograph
- Safety systems: TVM-300, KVB
- Track gauge: 1,435 mm (4 ft 8 1/2 in) standard gauge

The TGV La Poste were dedicated trainsets for high-speed freight and mail transportation by French railway company SNCF on behalf of the French postal carrier La Poste. The top speed of this TGV Sud-Est derivate was 270 km/h (168 mph), making them the fastest freight trains in the world. They were withdrawn in 2015.

== Services ==
The trainsets were built by Alstom between 1978 and 1986. These TGV units are essentially TGV Sud-Est trainsets that are modified for transporting mail. 5 half-trainsets were built, numbered 1–5. A further two, numbered 6 and 7, were converted from former TGV-SE trainset no. 38. Each half-trainset consisted of a power car and four intermediate-trailers.

In 2009, La Poste reduced services from 8 to 6 daily round trips.

On 21 March 2012 a demonstration freight train ran to London-St Pancras, but there was no follow-up.

In mid-2015, La Poste ended TGV postal services, shifting mail services to swap bodies instead as part of a major logistics restructuring and expansion which the trainsets were not capable of handling. Additionally, the demand for fast overnight mail services has been decreasing in recent years. The final service was on 27 June 2015 between Cavaillon (Marseille) and Charolais (Paris). La Poste originally was seeking a buyer for the fleet, however in December 2016 three trainsets were dismantled by SME (Société Métallurgique d'Épernay) leaving only a half spare trainset left.

== Fleet details ==
Class	Number in service	Year built	Operator	Current units	Notes
Series 923000	2.5 (5 half-sets)	1981	La Poste	P1-P5	
Series 923000	1 (2 half-sets)	1984	La Poste	P6-P7	Rebuilt from SNCF TGV Sud-Est passenger trainset no. 38

== See also ==
- British Rail Class 325, 161 km/h (100 mph) postal EMUs used in Britain
- FS Class ETR 500, in freight operation since October, 2018. Maximum speed is 300 km/h (186 mph), average speed is 180 km/h (112 mph).
