= TGV POS =

French high-speed train

TGV POS–Duplex
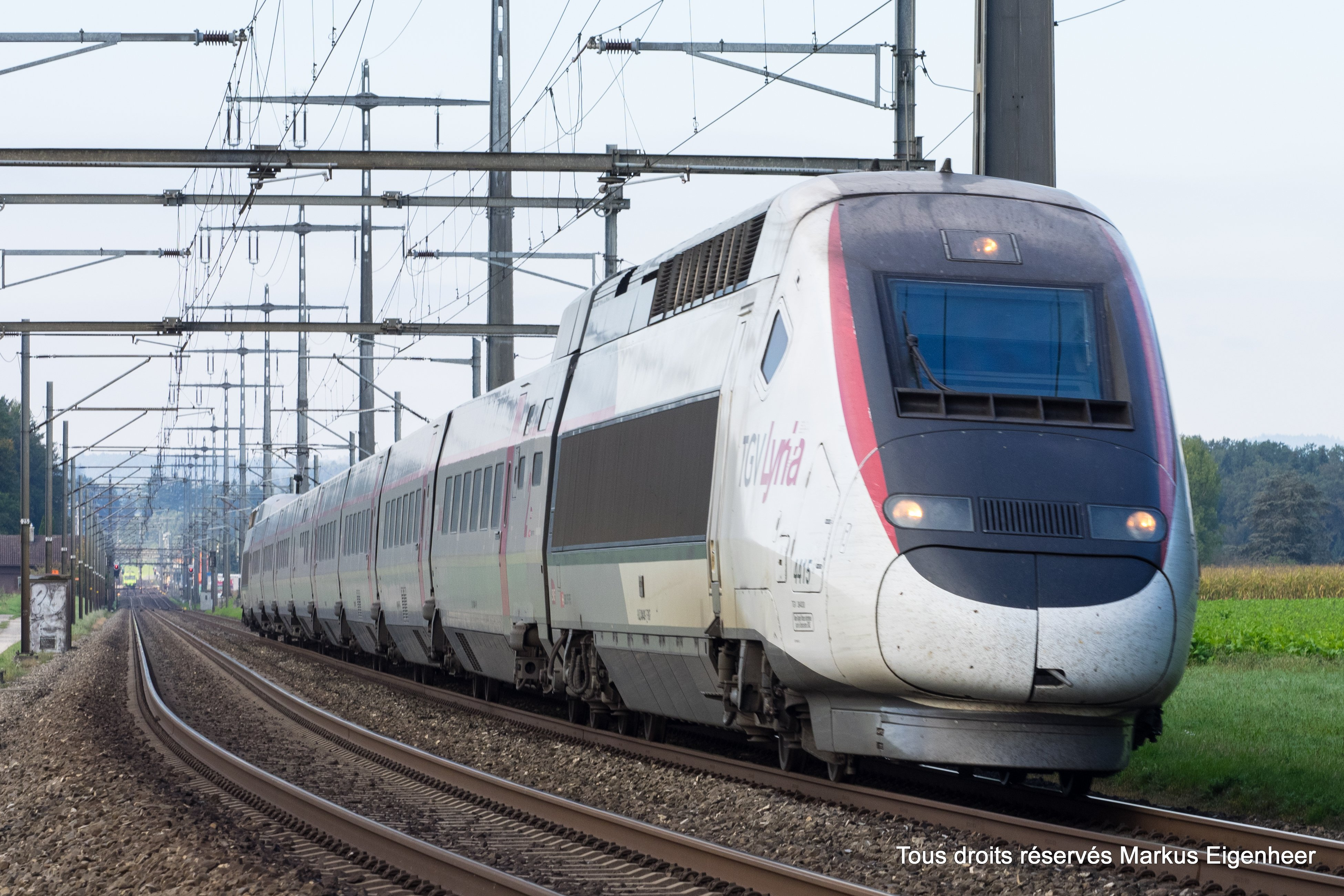
- SNCF TGV Lyria 4415 at Lyssacherkurve in Lyssach, Switzerland
- In service: 2006–2026
- Manufacturer: Alstom
- Replaced: TGV Sud-Est
- Number built: 38 motor cars
- Formation: 2 motor cars + 8 trailers
- Operator: SNCF
- Lines served: LGV Est; LGV Rhin-Rhône; LGV Sud-Est; LGV Nord

Specifications
- Train length: 200.19 m (656 ft 9 in)
- Width: Motor car 2.81 m (9 ft 3 in); Trailer 2.904 m (9 ft 6.3 in)
- Height: 4.1 m (13 ft 5 in) (power car), 3.42 m (11 ft 3 in) (trailer)
- Weight: 383 t (377 long tons; 422 short tons) (empty)
- Acceleration: ≥1.7 km/(h⋅s) (1.1 mph/s)(0–100 km/h (0–62 mph)), 0.35 km/(h⋅s) (0.22 mph/s) (at 320 km/h (199 mph)), from 0 to 320 km/h (0 to 199 mph) within 5 minutes 20 seconds and 18 km (11.2 mi)
- Electric systems: Overhead line: 25 kV 50 Hz AC; 15 kV 16.7 Hz AC; 1,500 V DC
- Current collection: CX Pantograph
- Safety systems: TVM-430, KVB, LZB, PZB
- Track gauge: 1,435 mm (4 ft 8 1/2 in) standard gauge

The TGV POS–Duplex was a TGV train built by French manufacturer Alstom which is operated by the French national rail company, the SNCF, in France's high-speed rail lines. It was originally ordered by the SNCF for use on the LGV Est, which was put into service in 2007. POS is an abbreviation of Paris-Ostfrankreich-Süddeutschland (English: Paris, Eastern France, Southern Germany), the route of the LGV Est.

== History ==
The TGV POS project was a unique extension of the TGV Duplex order. Alstom delivered to SNCF 38 new tri-current power cars and 19 sets of double-deck Duplex passenger carriages.

The tri-current power cars were paired with the 19 sets of single-level passenger carriages from TGV Réseau trainsets, while the two-level Duplex passenger carriages were paired with the 38 dual-current power cars from the Réseau trainsets. The tri-current function was necessary for the LGV Est, which ends at the German border, where the electrification switches to the 15 kV 16.7 Hz AC system. Meanwhile, the heavily congested lines where the Réseau trainsets were used needed the additional passenger capacity provided by the Duplex passenger carriages.

The project allowed SNCF to receive the tri-current power cars needed ahead of the opening of the LGV Est, without slowing the production of the Duplex trainsets.

The TGV POS power cars have a total power output of 9.6 MW (12,874 hp) under 25 kV 50 Hz AC, and 6.8 MW (9,119 hp) under 15 kV 16.7 Hz AC, with a top speed of 320 kilometres per hour (199 mph) under either system.

Each TGV POS trainset weighs 383 t (377 long tons; 422 short tons) and is numbered in the 4400 series. The livery is the same as that of TGV Réseau sets (silver and blue).

From 2013 to 2019, all of the TGV POS trainsets were shifted from LGV Est to the TGV Lyria service (a joint-venture by SNCF and the Swiss Federal Railways) between France and Switzerland, replacing the nine TGV Sud-Est trainsets that had been used.

Since 2019, all TGV POS trainsets operate strictly on domestic services.

Since 2023, TGV POS and Réseau Duplex trainsets have been undergoing rebuilding programs, resulting in reconfigured TGV Réseau and TGV POS Duplex trainsets. The TGV POS Duplex is rebuilt using power cars from former TGV POS sets and passenger coaches from the TGV Réseau Duplex fleet; from 2019 onward, the 15 kV AC electrical equipment was removed from the POS power cars. The 19 TGV POS Duplex sets are being refurbished for domestic service in France under the inOui and Ouigo brands.

== World rail speed record ==
On 3 April 2007 a train using both power cars of the TGV POS trainset number 4402 set a new world speed record for travel on conventional rails. The Project V150 train reached 574.8 km/h (357.2 mph). As part of a series of increasingly faster runs that culminated in the official record attempt, it set an unofficial speed record of 554.3 km/h (344.4 mph) on 13 February 2007.

Between the TGV POS power cars were three specially modified Duplex cars. The cars closest to the locomotive were each fitted with two powered bogies, similar to the AGV prototype (four Alstom 12 LCS 3550 C traction motors), providing four more powered axles than the trainset used during the 1990 TGV world speed record, and had a theoretical maximum power output of 19.6 MW (26,284 hp).

The train set ran with larger wheels, and the voltage of the overhead lines was increased to 31 kV from the standard 25 kV. The maximum speed was achieved near kilometer post 193 on the LGV Est between Meuse and the Champagne-Ardenne TGV stations.

== See also ==
- ICE 3
- TGV Duplex
- SNCF TGV Thalys PBKA
- KTX-Sancheon
- List of high-speed trains
