= V150 =

V150 may refer to:

- Cadillac Gage V-150 Commando, an armored car
- ITU-T V.150, a telecommunications standard
- Project V150, a record-setting train
