= SNCF TGV Sud-Est =

French high speed TGV train

SNCF TGV "Sud-Est"
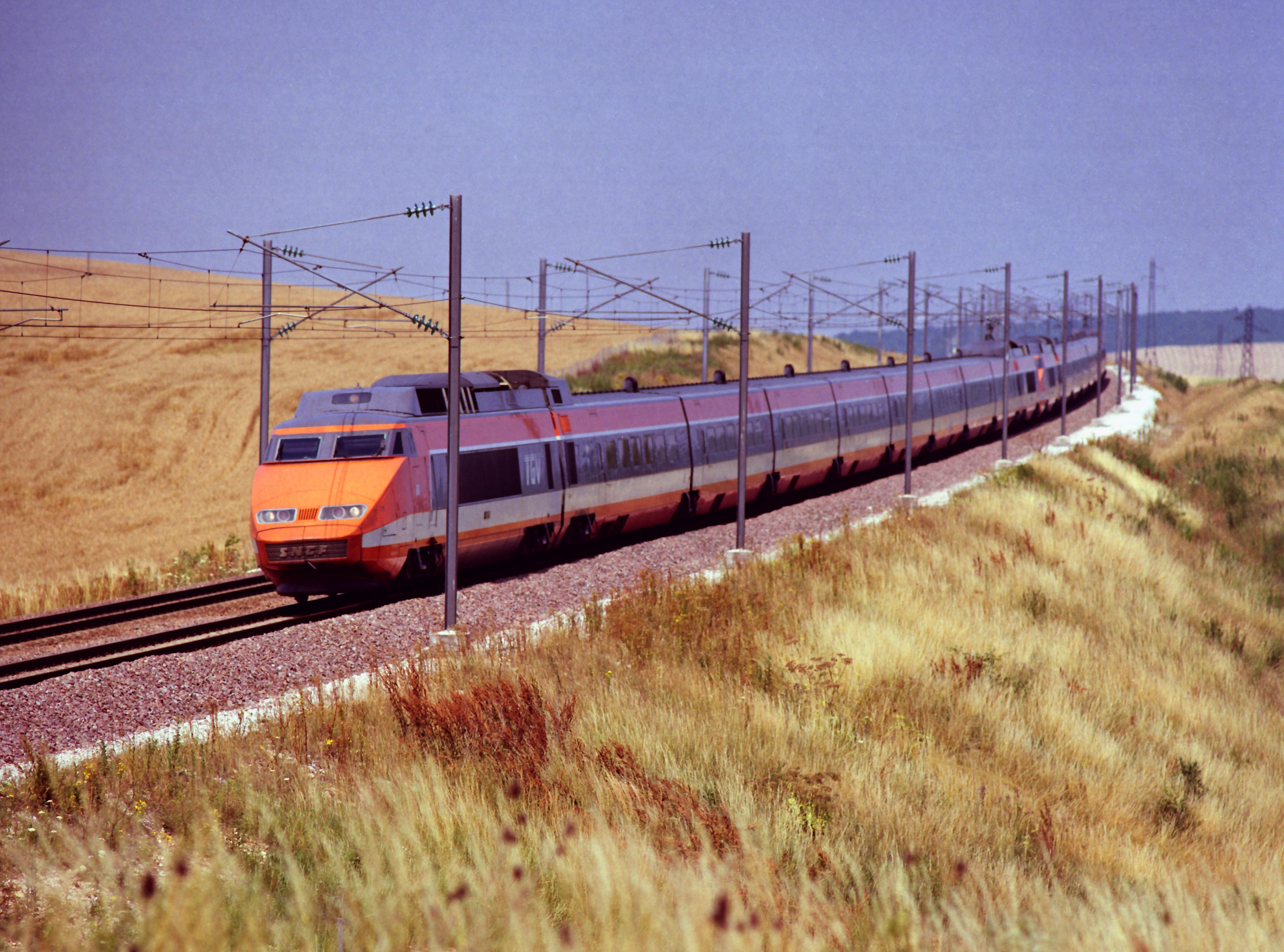
- TGV Sud-Est trainset travelling from Lyon to Paris in July 1984

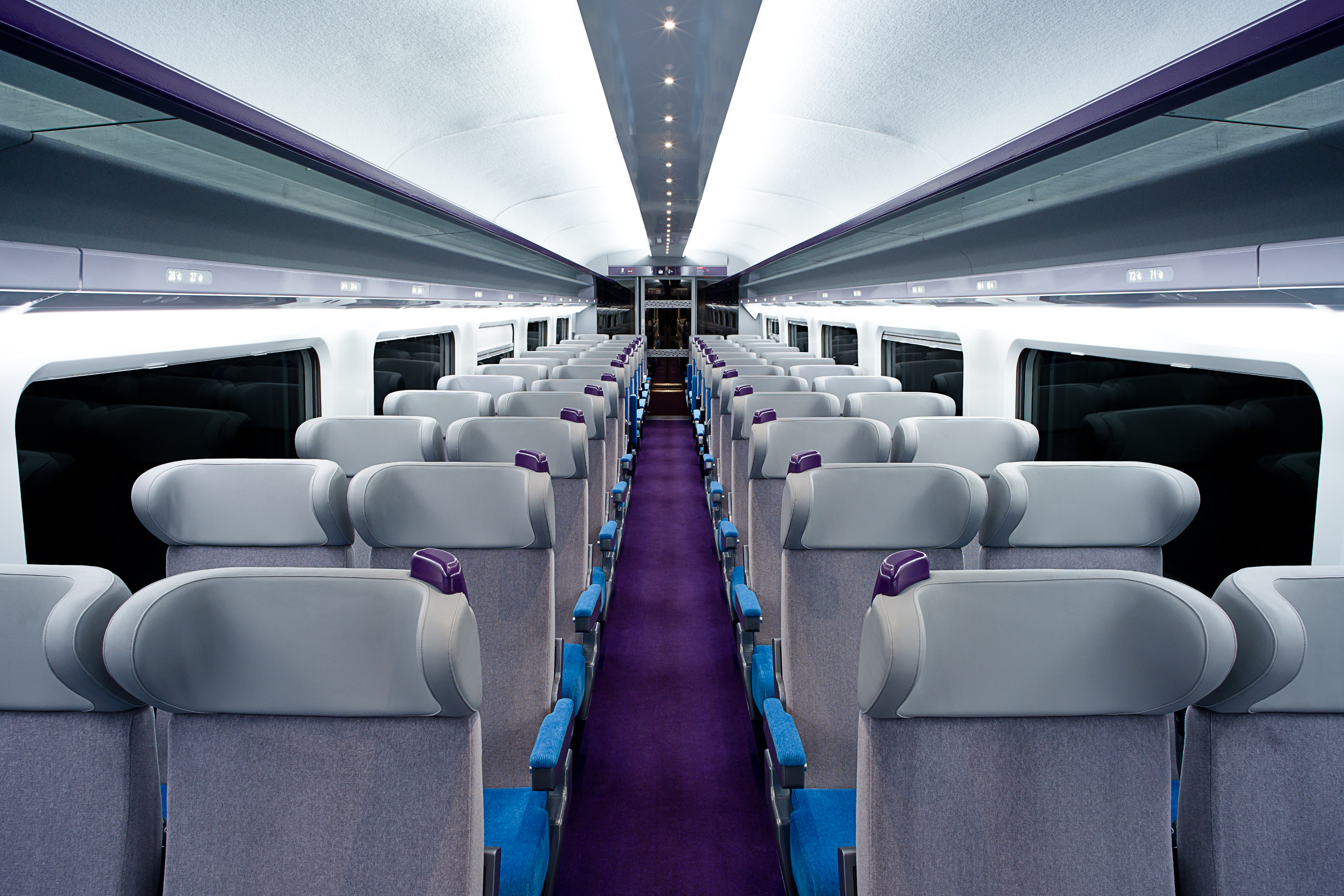
- Second class interior
- In service: 1981–2020
- Manufacturer: Alstom/Francorail-MTE
- Family name: TGV - 23 000 series
- Scrapped: 2012–2021
- Number built: 111
- Number preserved: 4
- Number scrapped: 107
- Successor: TGV POS
- Formation: 2 power cars, 8 passenger cars
- Fleet numbers: 01–37, 39–69, 71–87, 89–102, 110–118
- Capacity: 287–355
- Operator: SNCF

Specifications
- Train length: 200 m (656 ft 2 in)
- Width: Motor car 2.81 m (9 ft 3 in); Trailer 2.904 m (9 ft 6.3 in)
- Wheel diameter: 885 mm (2 ft 10.8 in)
- Maximum speed: 300 km/h (186 mph) (originally 260 km/h or 162 mph)
- Weight: 385 t (379 long tons; 424 short tons) (bi-current)
- Traction system: Thyristor-based current-source inverter by GEC-Alsthom
- Power output: 6,800 kW (9,119 hp) @ 25 kV AC; 3,100 kW (4,157 hp) @ 1.5 kV DC
- Gear ratio: Originally: 1 : 1.934; Currently: (unknown)
- Electric systems: Overhead line: 25 kV 50 Hz AC; 1,500 V DC; 15 kV 16.7 Hz Tri-voltage only – for Swiss
- Current collection: Pantograph
- UIC classification: Bo′Bo′+Bo′(2)′(2)′(2)′(2)′(2)′(2)′(2)′Bo′+Bo′Bo′
- Braking systems: Pneumatic and Regenerative
- Safety systems: TVM-300, KVB
- Track gauge: 1,435 mm (4 ft 8 1/2 in) standard gauge

The SNCF TGV Sud-Est is a retired French high speed TGV train built by Alstom and Francorail-MTE and operated by SNCF, the French national railway company. A total of 111 trainsets were built between 1978 and 1988 for the first TGV service in France between Paris and Lyon which opened in 1981. The trainsets were semi-permanently coupled, consisting of two power cars and eight articulated passenger carriages, ten in the case of the tri-voltage sets. The trains were named after the Ligne à Grande Vitesse Sud-Est (lit. 'Southeast high-speed line') that they first operated on. They were also referred to as TGV-PSE, an abbreviation of Paris Sud-Est.

== History ==
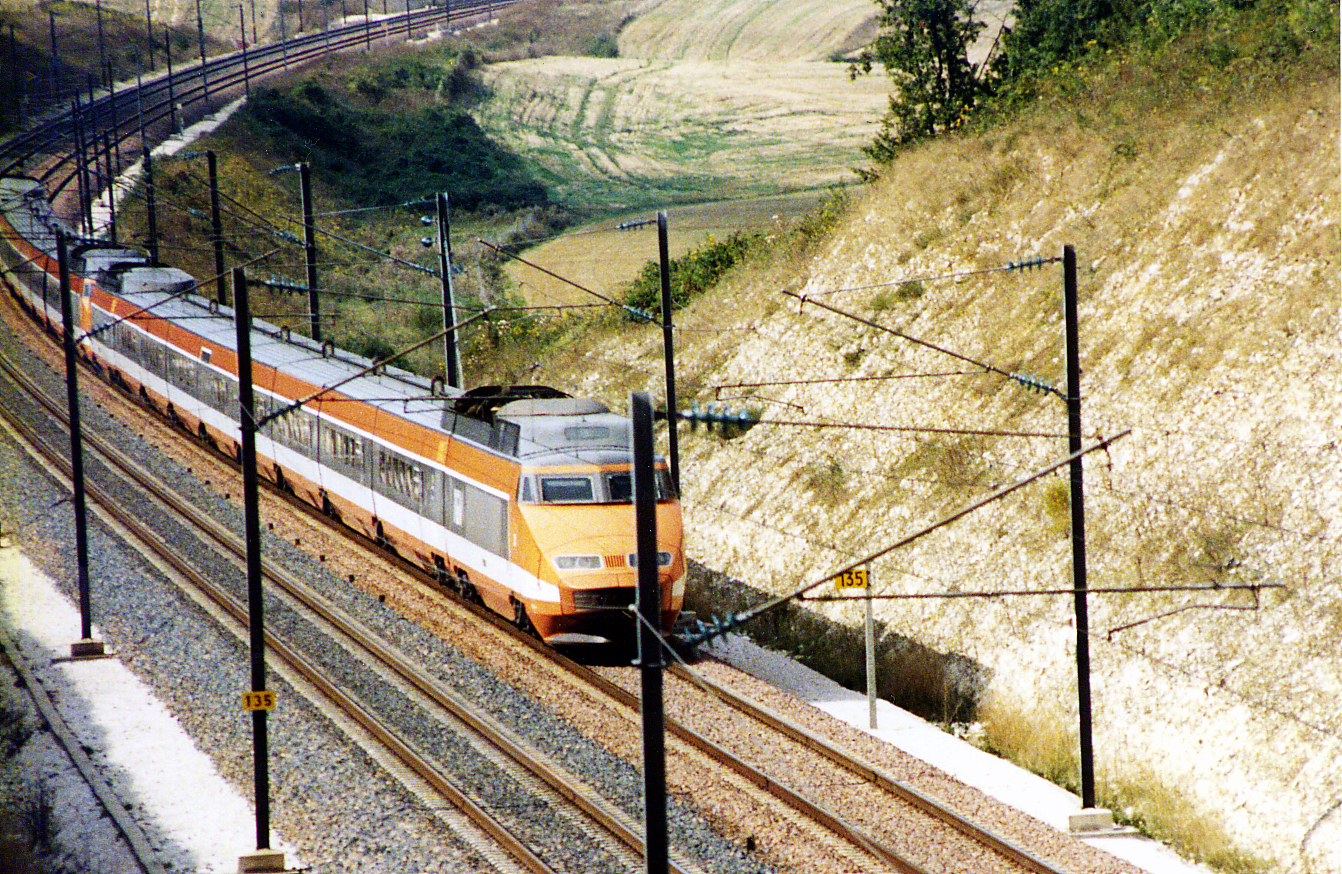
A TGV Sud-Est set in the original orange livery, 1987

The TGV Sud-Est fleet was built between 1978 and 1988 and operated the first TGV service from Paris to Lyon in 1981. Formerly there were 107 passenger sets operating, of which nine were tri-current (25 kV 50–60 Hz AC – French lignes à grande vitesse, 1500 V DC – French lignes classiques, 15 kV 16 2/3 Hz AC – Switzerland) and the rest bi-current (25 kV 50–60 Hz AC, 1500 V DC). There were also five, later seven, bi-current half-sets – TGV La Poste – without seats which carried mail for La Poste between Paris, Lyon and Avignon. These were painted in the distinctive La Poste yellow livery.

Each set was made up of two power cars and eight carriages (capacity 345 seats), including a powered bogie in each of the carriages adjacent to the power cars. They were 200 m (656 ft 2 in) long and 2.904 m (9 ft 6.3 in) wide. They weighed 385 tonnes (379 long tons; 424 short tons) with a power output of 6,450 kW (8,650 hp) under 25 kV.

When the trains were delivered they wore a distinctive orange, grey, and white livery. The last set to wear this livery was repainted in the silver livery similar to the TGV Atlantique sets in 2001. From 2012 trains were repainted in the new SNCF Carmillon livery. The TGV Sud-Est sets can be distinguished visually from the Atlantique and Réseau sets by less streamlined power cars, as well as different placement of the door on the bistro coach.

Originally the sets were built to run at 270 km/h (168 mph) but most were upgraded to 300 km/h (186 mph) during their mid-life refurbishment in preparation for the opening of the LGV Méditerranée. The few sets which still have a maximum speed of 270 km/h (168 mph) operate on routes which have a comparatively short distance on the lignes à grande vitesse, such as those to Switzerland via Dijon. SNCF did not consider it financially worthwhile to upgrade their speed for a marginal reduction in journey time.

Nine sets were originally delivered as all first class. Set 88 was used as a test train for synchronous traction motors then subsequently rebuilt as a tri-voltage set and renumbered 118. Set 114 was sold to SBB in 1993 and a second set in 2005. In 1995, Set 38, one of the all first class sets, was converted to an extra postal set in addition to the existing 5 half-sets.

In March 2012, a hired postal set, numbered 951, was taken to London to advertise the Euro Carex project.

In February 2013 the TGV Lyria sets (110 to 118), designed for services to Switzerland, were taken out of service. These were replaced by TGV POS sets.

In December 2019, all TGV Sud-Est sets were retired from service. In early 2020, a farewell service was run using the first production TGV set built. This train was painted in all 3 liveries that it used during its service.

== In service ==
The TGV Sud-Est sets were originally used on services between Paris, Lyon, Marseille and other cities in the south-east of France. In 2013 there were still 55 sets in use on services to south-eastern France and on cross-country services. The remaining sets were replaced by TGV POS in late 2019.

== Fleet list ==
=== Numbering ===
The power cars were numbered as Class 23000 dual voltage locomotives, with the trailers being numbered according to the position in the set they were allocated to. So for Set XXX they would be numbered 123XXX, 223XXX, 323XXX and so on. The triple-voltage sets were numbered similarly but as Class 33000. Postal half sets were initially numbered P1–P5, later to P7. The power cars were numbered 923001—005, similarly the intermediate vehicles added a 9 in front of number.

=== Names ===
Many of the sets received names, principally of French communes, towns and cities. The names were carried on the two non-driving motor cars at each end of the articulated rake.

Dual voltage sets
Set Number	Name	Set Number	Name
Set 01	Patrick	Set 52	Genève
Set 02	Marseille	Set 53	Le Puy-en-Velay
Set 03	Belfort	Set 54	Chagny
Set 04	Rambouillet	Set 55	Denain
Set 05	Ris-Orangis	Set 56	Annecy
Set 06	Frasne	Set 57	Bourg-en-Bresse
Set 07	Conflans-Sainte-Honorine	Set 58	Oullins
Set 08	Rouen	Set 59	Hautmont
Set 09	Vincennes	Set 60	Langeac
Set 10	Hayange	Set 61	Fontainebleau
Set 11	Nîmes	Set 62	Toulouse
Set 12	Le Havre	Set 63	Villeurbanne
Set 13	Ablon-sur-Seine	Set 64	Dole
Set 14	Montpellier	Set 65	Sète
Set 15	Pau	Set 66	Avignon
Set 16	Lyon	Set 67	Bellegarde-sur-Valserine
Set 17	Tergnier	Set 68	Modane
Set 18	Le Creusot	Set 69	Vichy
Set 19	Saint-Amand-les-Eaux	Set 70	Melun
Set 20	Colmar	Set 71	Brunoy
Set 21	Dijon	Set 72	Cahors
Set 22	Valenciennes	Set 73	Charenton-le-Pont
Set 23	Montbard	Set 74	Arbois-Mouchard-Port-Lesney
Set 24	Alfortville	Set 75	
Set 25	Besançon	Set 76	Pontarlier
Set 26	Saint-Étienne	Set 77	Nuits-Saint-Georges
Set 27	Mâcon	Set 78	Culoz
Set 28	Montélimar	Set 79	Annemasse
Set 29	Villeneuve-Saint-Georges	Set 80	Toulon
Set 30	Lille	Set 81	Tonnerre
Set 31	Combs-la-Ville	Set 82	Trappes
Set 32	Maisons-Alfort	Set 83	Moissy-Cramayel
Set 33	Fécamp	Set 84	Dieppe
Set 34	Dunkerque	Set 85	Beaune
Set 35	Grenoble	Set 86	Montluçon
Set 36	Seine-Saint-Denis	Set 87	Montchanin
Set 37	Saint-Germain-en-Laye	Set 88/118	
Set 38/P6, P7		Set 89	
Set 39	Évian + Thonon	Set 90	
Set 40	Versailles	Set 91	
Set 41	Villiers-le-Bel	Set 92	
Set 42	Chambéry	Set 93	
Set 43	Aix-les-Bains	Set 94	
Set 44	Clermont-Ferrand	Set 95	
Set 45	Valence	Set 96	
Set 46	Contrexéville	Set 97	
Set 47	Nancy	Set 98	
Set 48	Comte-de-Nice	Set 99	
Set 49	Rennes	Set 100	Saint Gervais-les-Bains
Set 50	Beauvais	Set 101	
Set 51	Givors + Grigny-Badan	Set 102	
Tri-voltage sets
Set Number	Name	Set Number	Name
Set 110	Pays de Vaud	Set 114	
Set 111		Set 115	
Set 112	Lausanne	Set 116	
Set 113		Set 116	
Set 114		Set 117	

== Preservation ==
3 Powercars of the TGV Sud-Est sets are preserved along with a cab end and one complete set

- Cab end of No. 53 at Cité du train, Mulhouse.
- Powercar No. 57 at the former La Chapelle depot as part of the "Grand Train" exhibition 40.
- Powercar No. 61 by the Bischheim technicenter and intended for the Cité du train, Mulhouse
- Powercar No. 112 at the Railway Museum in Ambérieu-en-Bugey.
- Set No. 16 used on tours celebrating the speed record of the Sud-Est in 1981

== Fleet details ==
Class	No. in Service	Year built	Operator	Current Units	Notes
Series 23000	0	1978–1985	SNCF	01–37, 39–69, 71–87, 89–102	Bicurrent; No. 38 rebuilt as TGV La Poste; No. 70 scrapped 1988; No. 88 rebuilt for TGV Atlantique testing No. 101 rebuilt for tilt testing Retired in December 2019
Series 33000	0	1978–1985	SNCF	110–118	Tricurrent

== See also ==
- List of high speed trains
