= Project V150 =

French high-speed train trials, 2007

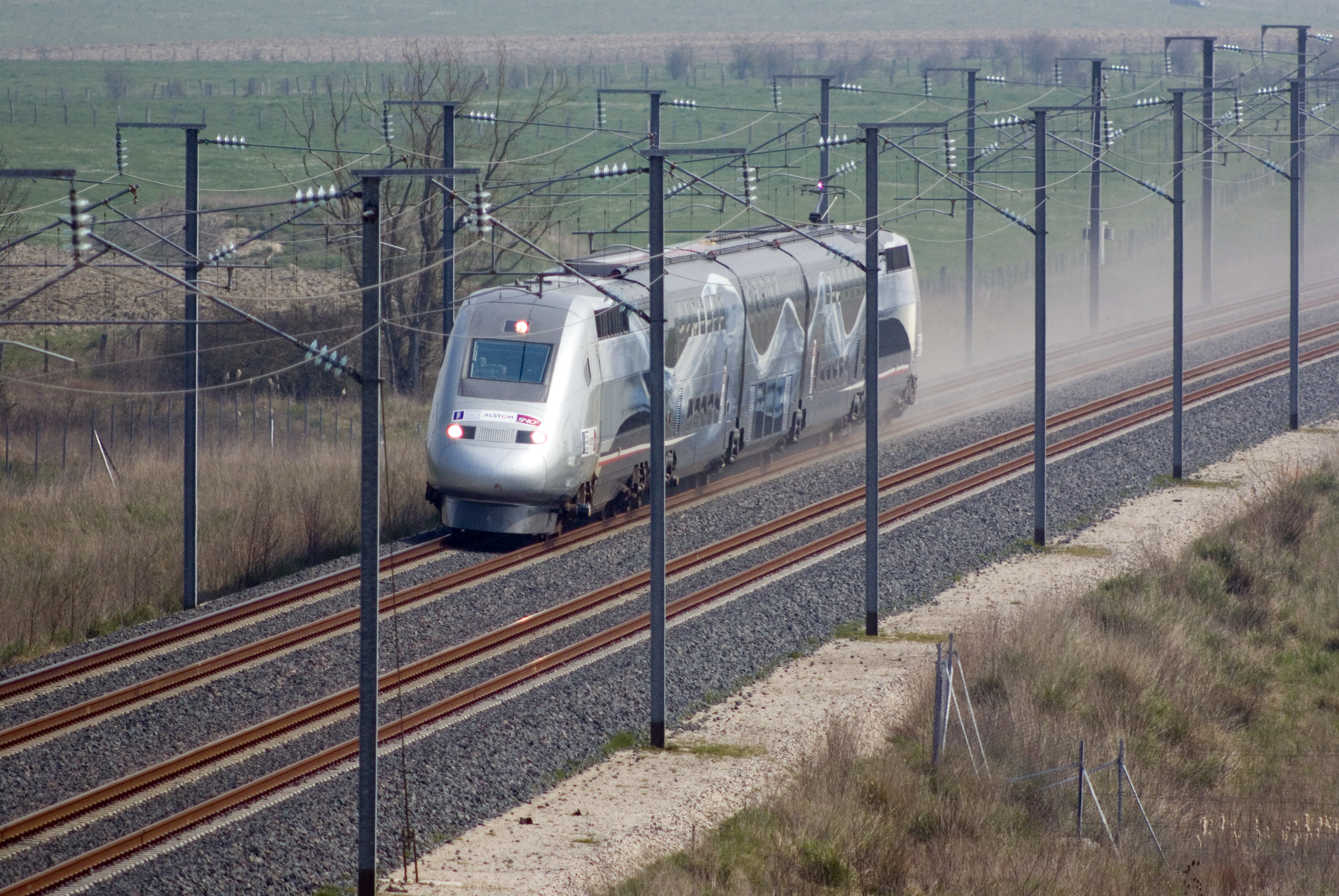
TGV 4402 (operation V150) reaching 574 km/h on 3 April 2007 near Le Chemin, France.

Operation V150, where 150 refers to a target speed in metres per second, was a series of high-speed trials carried out on the LGV Est. The V150 was a specially configured TGV high-speed train (weighing only 265 tonnes (292 tons)) notable for breaking the world railway speed record on 3 April 2007. The train was built in France and reached a speed of 574.8 kilometres per hour (357.2 mph; 159.7 m/s) on an unopened section of the LGV Est between Strasbourg and Paris, in France topping the previous record of 515.3 kilometres per hour (320.2 mph; 143.1 m/s) set in 1990.

== Record of 2007 ==
Operation V150 trials were carried out on the LGV Est prior to its June 2007 opening. The trials were conducted jointly by SNCF, TGV builder Alstom, and LGV Est owner Réseau Ferré de France between 15 January 2007 and 15 April 2007. Following a series of increasingly high-speed runs, the official speed record attempt took place on 3 April 2007. The top speed of 574.8 km/h (159.7 m/s, 357.2 mph) was reached at kilometre point 193 near the village of Le Chemin, between the Meuse and Champagne-Ardenne TGV stations, where the most favorable profile exists.

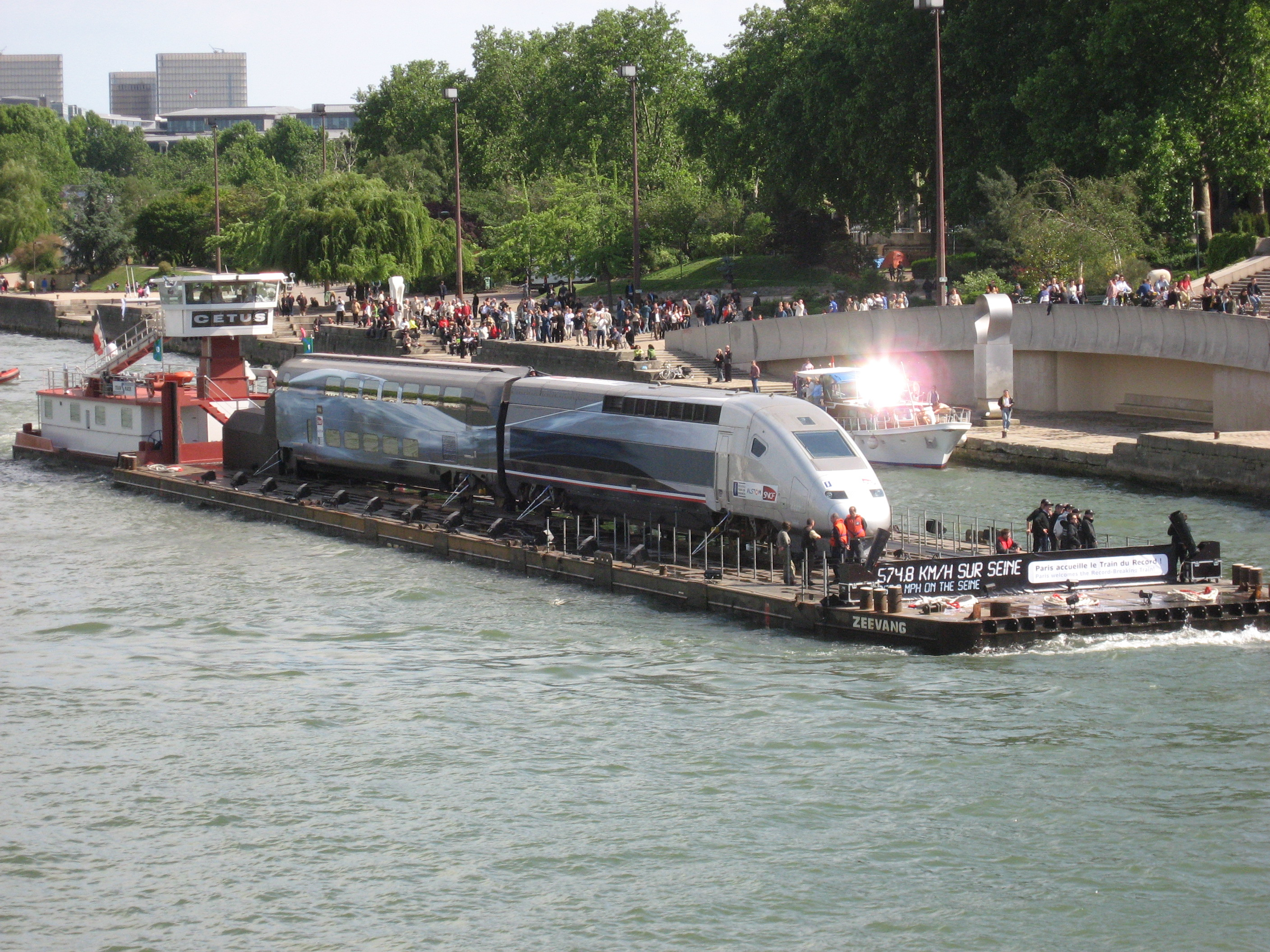
Part of the record-breaking V150 unit being sailed in triumph down the Seine for display at the foot of the Eiffel Tower

The 515.3 km/h (320.2 mph) speed record of 1990 was unofficially broken multiple times during the test campaign that preceded and followed the certified record attempt, the first time on 13 February 2007 with a speed of 554.3 kilometres per hour (344.4 mph), and the last time on 15 April 2007 with a speed of 542.9 kilometres per hour (337.3 mph).

=== V150 record train ===
The train used for the speed record was code named V150, and comprised three modified Duplex cars, fitted with two powered bogies similar to the AGV prototype, marshalled between a pair of TGV power cars from POS trainset 4402. The train had four more powered axles than trainset 325 used in the 1990 speed record, and had a maximum power output of 19.6 MW (26,300 hp) instead of the 9.3 MW (12,500 hp) on a standard TGV POS. This unusual composition was used to obtain high speed test data on disparate technical elements including the new asynchronous traction motors on the POS power cars, the lightweight synchronous permanent magnet traction motors on the AGV bogies, the actively controlled pantograph, and the Duplex bi-level configuration which had never been used in very high speed trials.

Aerodynamic improvements, similar to the 1990 record train, were refined in a wind tunnel and provided a 15% reduction in drag from the standard configuration. These improvements included a front air dam, roof fairings over the pantograph openings, membranes to cover the space between the cars, and a flush-mounted windshield. Over 600 sensors were fitted on various parts of both the engines and the cars. The train set ran with larger wheels with a diameter of 1,092 mm (43.0 in) instead of 920 mm (36.2 in), to limit the rotational speed of the powertrain.

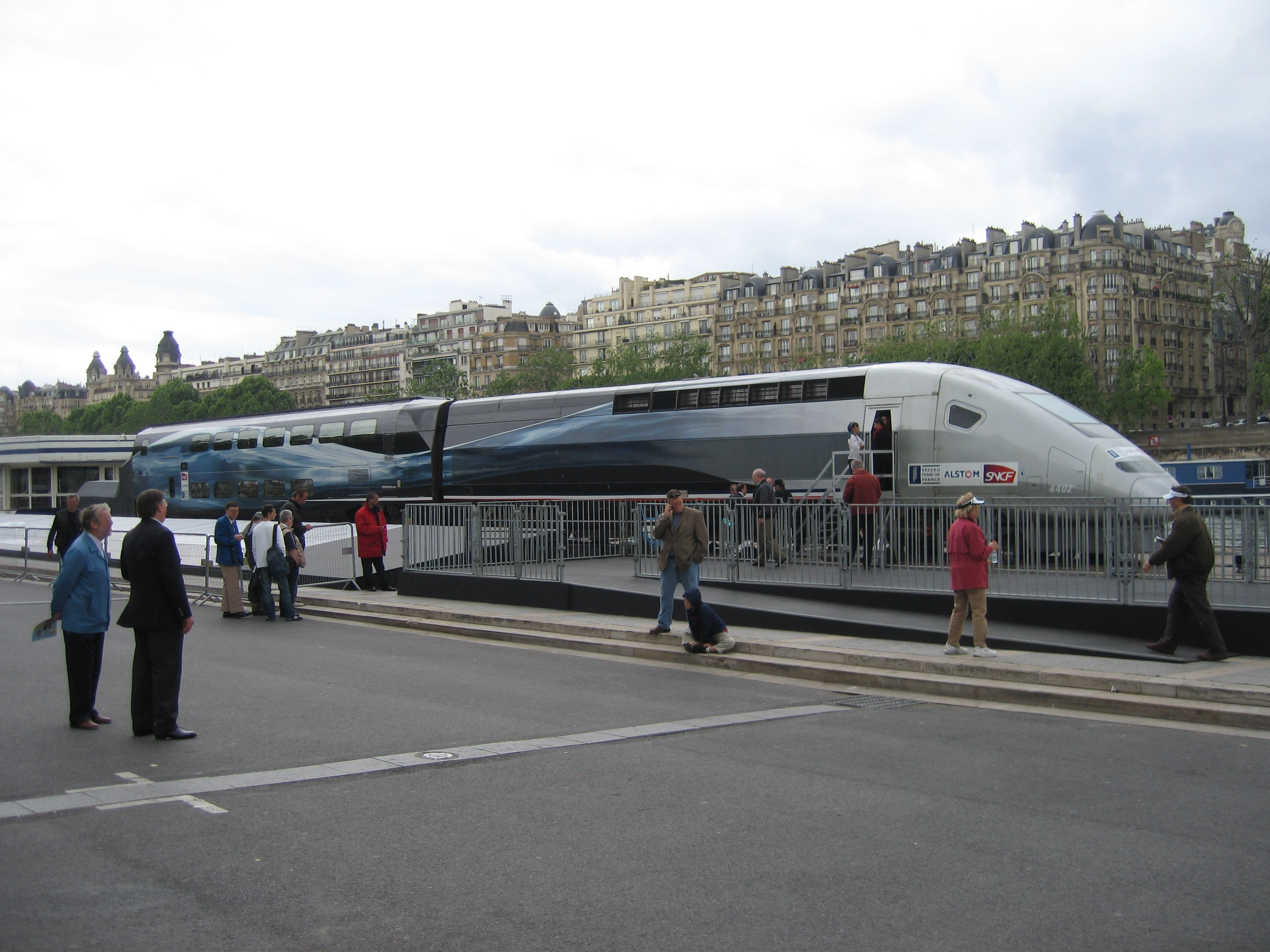
Part of TGV trainset 4402 displayed near the Eiffel Tower after the record

=== Test track ===
The record runs took place on a 140-kilometre (87 mi) section of track 1 on the LGV Est, usually heading west, between kilometre posts 264 (town of Prény) and 120 (near the Champagne-Ardenne TGV station). This section of the LGV was chosen for its vertical profile and gentle curves, with favorable downhill segments leading to the highest speeds between kilometre posts 195 and 191, near the border between the Meuse and Marne departments. The track superelevation was increased to support higher speeds. Catenary voltage was increased to 31 kV from the standard 25 kV. The mechanical tension in the wire was increased to 40 kN from the standard 25 kN. The speed of the transverse wave induced in the overhead wire by the train's pantograph was thus increased to 610 km/h (380 mph), providing a margin of safety beyond the train's maximum speed. Several measurement stations were installed along the test tracks to monitor stresses in the track and ballast, noise, aerodynamic effects, and catenary dynamics. Between kilometre posts 223 and 167, where speeds exceeded 500 km/h (311 mph), the track was under close surveillance.

=== Record runs ===
Between 15 January 2007 and 15 April 2007, the V150 train travelled at 500 kilometres per hour (311 mph) and above for a cumulative distance of 728 kilometres (452 mi). For each high speed run, another TGV performed a sweep of the track before the V150 train was cleared to start. This sweep was performed at a sustained 380 km/h (236 mph)—the peak speed reached in the record of 1981—by TGV POS trainset 4404 in a standard eight-car configuration. The acceleration of the V150 train took place over a distance of 70 kilometres (43 mi). During certain runs, including the official record run, the V150 train was chased by an Aérospatiale Corvette airplane to provide data relay and uplink of live television images.

== See also ==
- Land speed record for railed vehicles
- TGV
