= ICE 2 =

German high speed train

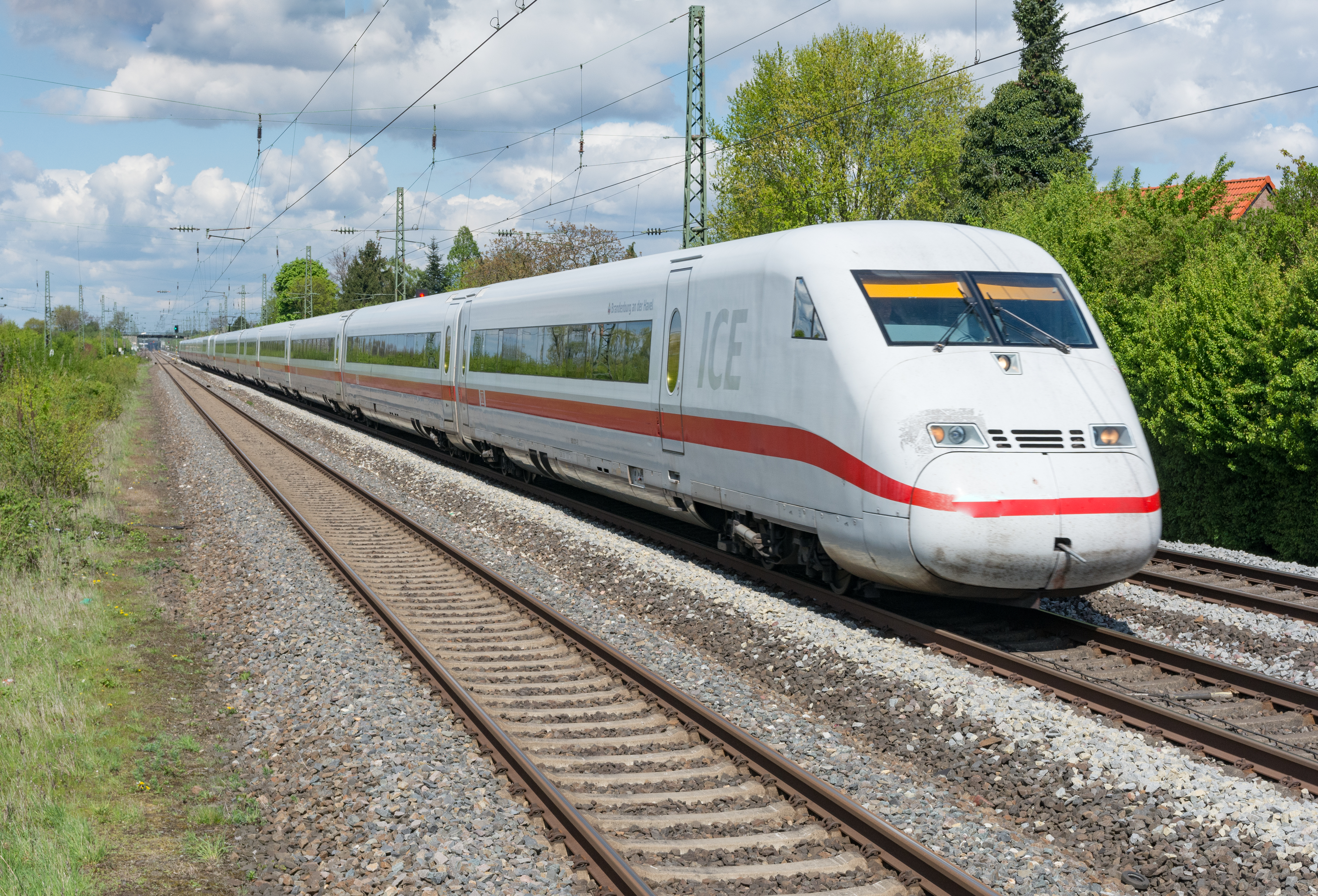
- Two coupled ICE 2 trainsets

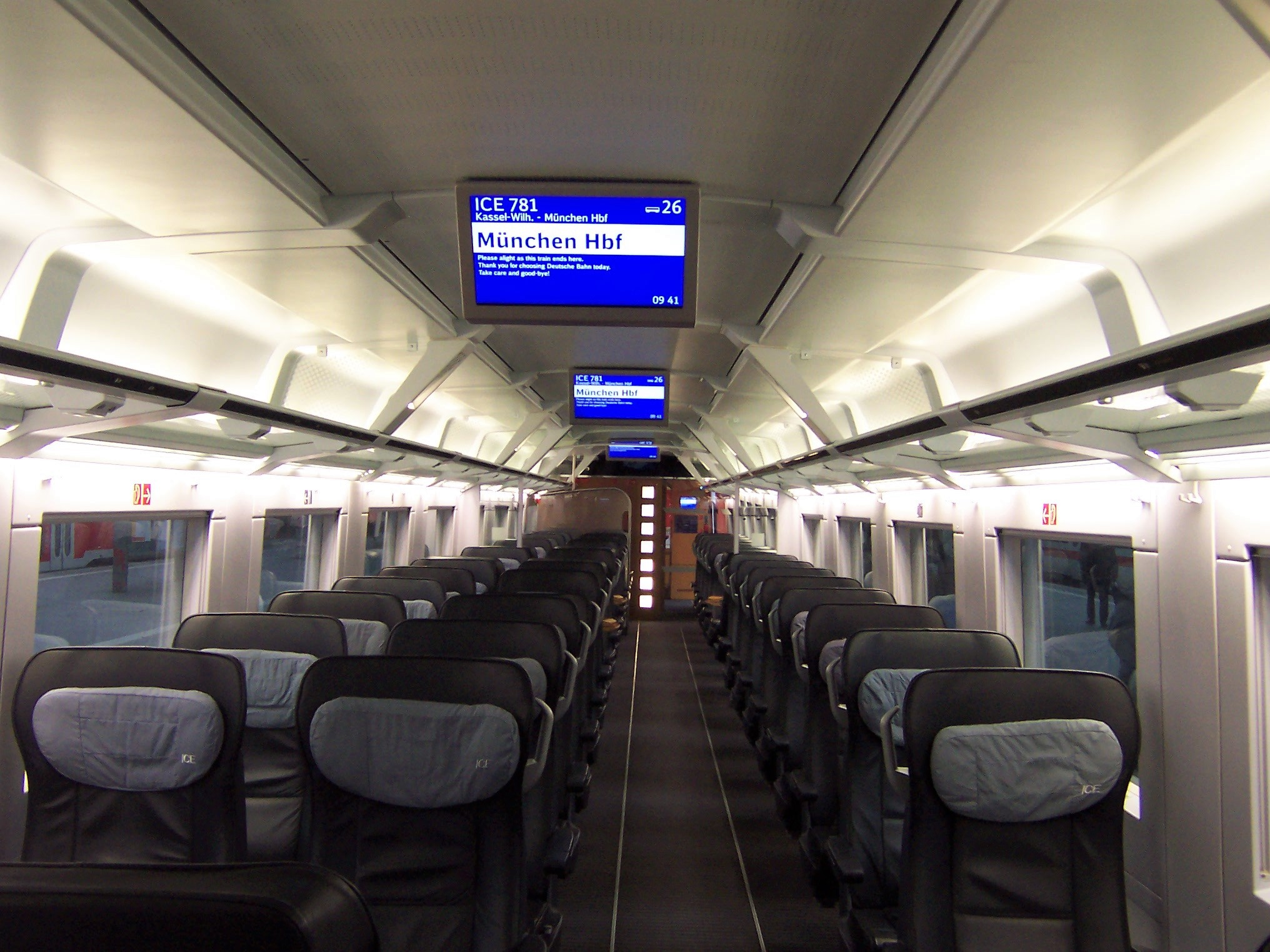
- First class interior
- Manufacturers: Adtranz, Siemens
- Constructed: 1995-1997
- Refurbished: 2010-2013
- Number built: 46
- Formation: 1 power car, 6 intermediate cars, 1 control car
- Fleet numbers: Tz 201 to 244
- Capacity: 391 seats
- Operator: DB Fernverkehr
- Depot: Berlin-Rummelsburg

Specifications
- Maximum speed: 280 km/h (175 mph)
- Weight: 412 t (405 long tons; 454 short tons)
- Traction system: Siemens SIBAS32 GTO-VVVF
- Traction motors: 4× AEG BAZU 7096/4.2
- Power output: 4,800 kW (6,400 hp)
- Electric system: 15 kV 16.7 Hz AC catenary
- Current collection: Pantograph
- Bogies: Siemens SF 400 (Note: Trailer bogies only.)
- Safety systems: Sifa, PZB90, LZB
- Track gauge: 1,435 mm (4 ft 8 1/2 in) standard gauge

The ICE 2 is the second series of German high-speed trains and one of six in the Intercity-Express family since 1995. Unlike the ICE 1, The ICE 2 trains are push–pull trains because each train consists of only one power car (Class 402, called powerhead), six passenger cars (Classes 805 to 807) and a cab car (Class 808). The maximum speed is 280 km/h (175 mph), but this is limited to 250 km/h (155 mph) when the cab car is leading the train and even further down to 160 km/h (100 mph) when two units are coupled at the powerheads due to the forces on the overhead line by their respective pantographs.

== History ==
On September 25, 2014, Mitsubishi Electric Corp. of Japan announced that it had received a contract from DB to supply new IGBT (insulated-gate bipolar transistor) power modules to replace the old GTO (Gate turn-off thyristor) power modules in the drives of 46 ICE 2 trainsets. Mitsubishi said that the modern smaller and lighter IGBT power modules will reduce power consumption and extend the life of the ICE 2 trains. The contract for $22 million was expected to be completed by 2019.

While it was still planned in 2022 that all 44 ICE 2 multiple units would still be in service in 2029, Deutsche Bahn announced in 2024 to gradually phase out all ICE 2 trainsets by 2027.

== Differences from ICE 1 ==
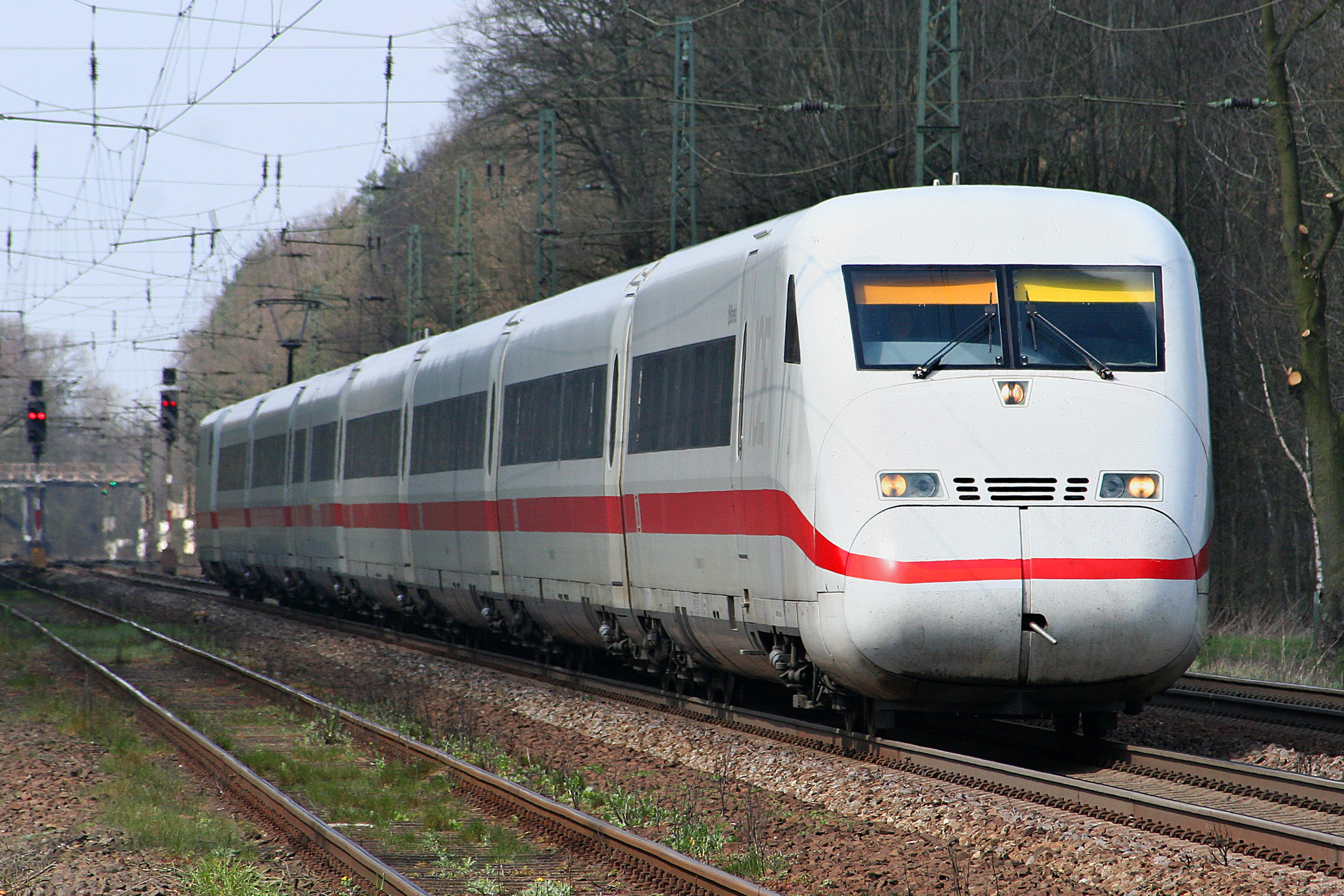
An unpowered ICE 2 control car with coupling equipment, both features the ICE 1 lacks.

=== Powerhead ===
Except for the automatic Scharfenberg coupling, ICE 2 powerheads are very similar to those of the ICE 1 and can actually be used in ICE 1 trains if the necessity arises.

=== Half-trains ===
Usually two ICE 2 half-trains are coupled to form a block train of similar dimensions to the original ICE 1 for serving the main routes, and separated again to operate on routes with less traffic or to provide the passengers two different destinations. Until the class 808 cab cars were cleared for passenger service, two ICE 2 half-trains had been solidly coupled to form a permanent block train.

=== Coaches ===
The passenger cars are very different from the ICE 1 cars, despite their similar exterior. The weight has been significantly reduced and the passenger compartments have been removed in favor of a seating arrangement similar to an airliner (due to reduced seat pitch). Also, the train has been equipped with air suspension to circumvent the wheel noise problems of the ICE 1, which led to the installation of rubber-buffered wheel rims on the ICE 1 units and therefore the Eschede train disaster. ICE 2 trains have no service car as the class 803 on ICE 1 trains, on the other hand the class 808 cab car is unique to the ICE 2.

== Routes ==
ICE 2 trains mainly run on the main east–west line, starting in Berlin with two coupled trainsets. In Hamm the train is then separated into two half-trains. One half-train goes through the Ruhr area to Düsseldorf and Cologne/Bonn Airport station, while the other half-train continues through Wuppertal and Cologne to Bonn. In the opposite direction, both half-trains are coupled again at Hamm. Some trains also serve the Munich—Hanover line with halves continuing to Hamburg and Bremen respectively.

== Eurotrain ==
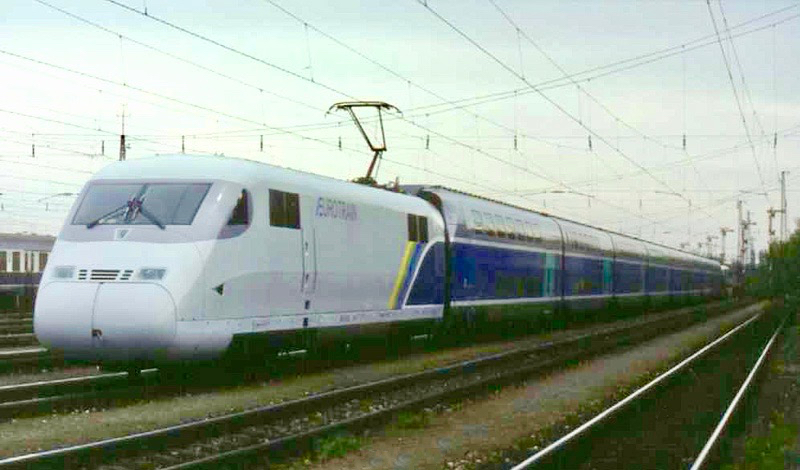
The Eurotrain demonstration trainset at Munich-Laim on 4 April 1998

Eurotrain was a joint venture formed by Siemens and GEC-Alsthom (today Alstom) in 1996 to market high-speed rail technology in Asia. In 1997, it was one of two competitors to supply the core system of Taiwan High Speed Rail (THSR), and was awarded the status of preferred bidder by concessionaire THSRC.

In early 1998, the two companies created a demonstration train by combining cars of three existing French and German high-speed trains: ICE 2 powerheads 402 042 and 402 046, were joined at both ends to the articulated double-deck intermediate cars of TGV Duplex trainset #224. On 4 May 1998, the Eurotrain demonstration train made a presentation run on the Hanover–Würzburg high-speed railway in Germany, achieving a maximum speed of 316 km/h (196 mph).

In December 2000, THSRC decided to award the contract to the rival Taiwan Shinkansen Consortium, leading to a legal battle ending in damage payments for Eurotrain in 2004.

== See also ==
- List of high-speed trains
