= Contrôle de vitesse par balises =

Train protection system

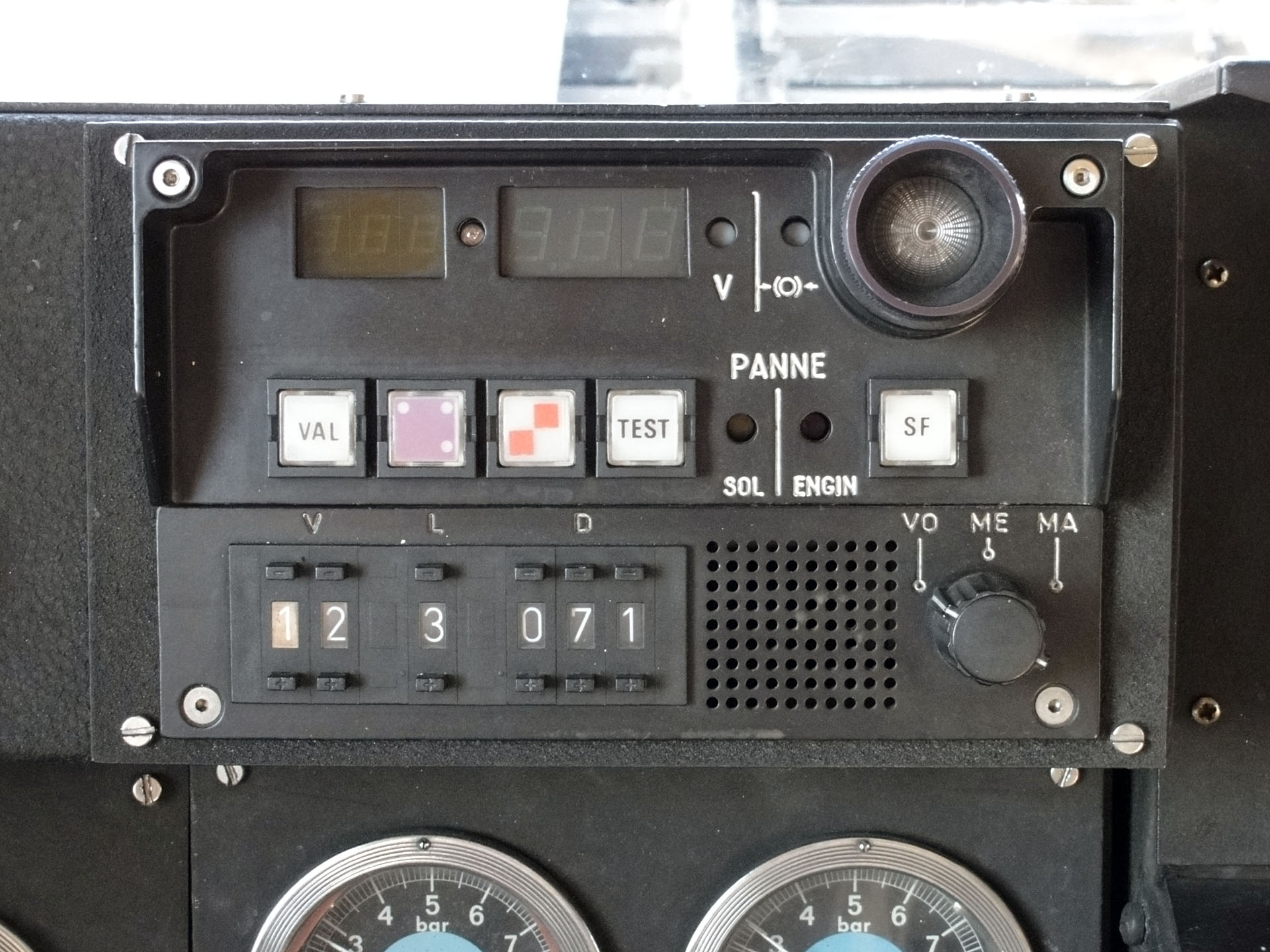

Contrôle de Vitesse par Balises (Speed control by beacons), abbreviated to KVB, (Note: "Contrôle" is abbreviated to "K", to distinguish it from "Commande") is a train protection system used in France and in London St. Pancras International station. It checks and controls the speed of moving trains.

KVB consists of:

- The on-board installation, known as bord (aboard), which comprises:
  - An on-board computer (UEVAL) containing a processor, a communication unit and recording equipment
  - A visual interface for the use of the driver, which
    - permits data entry regarding the train's speed, length and category.
    - displays information about the state of the system. It does not replicate trackside signals for the driver (for example, the speed limits are not indicated). This is because the KVB is a train protection system, not a cab-signalling system.
  - An antenna, placed under the locomotive, to receive information sent by the ground installations.
- The ground-based or sol (ground) installations, made up of:
  - Beacons or balises - digital or analogue transponders placed between the two track rails. These can be fixed beacons (sending a single set of information, e.g. placed at a point where there is a change of speed limit) or switchable beacons (sending a variety of messages, so that one signal can send different sets of information as required).
  - A coder used as an interface between the existing signal and the switchable beacons.

The on-board computer generates two speed-thresholds based on the received signals from the balises. If the train is over the speed limit, passing the first speed-threshold, an audible alarm sounds and the control panel indicates to the driver to adjust the train speed without delay. If the second speed threshold is passed, the KVB automatically engages emergency brakes on the train.

The system is an adaptation of a similar system that was used in Sweden, which uses an Intel 8085 microprocessor. The first generation French KVB also used this technology.

The next revisions evolved towards a Motorola 68020 processor and the software was re-written using the B-Method.

The decision to implement this technology was made at the beginning of the 1990s following accidents such as the Flaujac crash in 1985 and the 1991 Melun rail crash.

Every locomotive unit on the French national railway network, except those that operate connected to other locomotives, must be equipped with this system. More than 5,000 engines, including foreign locomotives that travel within France, are equipped. The TGV is equipped with this system for all of its routes over conventional rail lines.

A European system for train control, called ETCS, will replace this and many other diverse systems in the various member states of the European Union. KVB is comparable to ETCS Level 1 Limited Supervision because it offers a beacon-based speed control without any indication for the driver.
