= SNCF TGV Réseau =

High speed train used in France by the SNCF

SNCF TGV "Réseau"
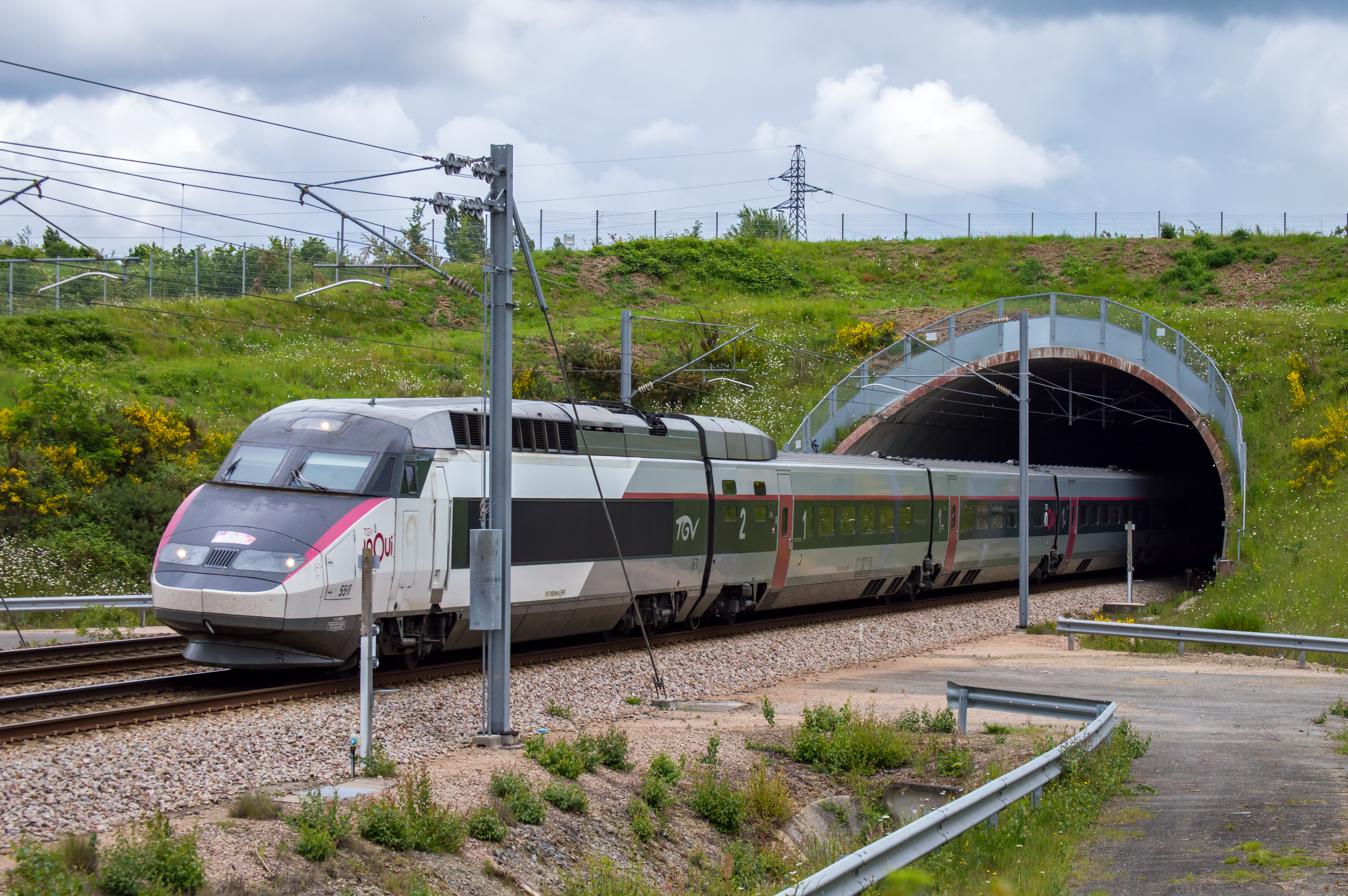
- TGV-R unit 550 seen in Cesson-Sévigné going towards Rennes
- In service: 1993–present
- Manufacturer: GEC-Alsthom
- Family name: TGV
- Constructed: 1992–1996
- Number built: 90
- Number in service: 66
- Formation: 2 power cars + 8 passenger cars, including 3 first class, 1 dining and 4 second class cars
- Capacity: SNCF original: 387 seats (120 first class, 257 second class); SNCF refurbished: 364 seats (110 first class, 254 second class); Eurostar: 404 seats (120 first class, 284 second class)
- Operators: SNCF; Eurostar

Specifications
- Train length: 200 m (656 ft 2 in)
- Width: Power cars: 2.81 m (9 ft 3 in); Passenger cars: 2.904 m (9 ft 6.3 in)
- Maximum speed: 320 km/h (199 mph)
- Weight: 383 t (844,000 lb) (dual voltage)
- Power output: 8,800 kW (11,801 hp) @ 25 kV AC
- Electric systems: Overhead line: 25 kV 50 Hz AC; 1,500 V DC; 3,000 V DC (tri-voltage sets)
- Current collection: Pantograph
- UIC classification: Bo′Bo′+2′(2)′(2)′(2)′(2)′(2)′(2)′(2)′2′+Bo′Bo′
- Safety systems: TVM-430, ERTMS level 2, KVB, LZB, PZB
- Track gauge: 1,435 mm (4 ft 8 1/2 in) standard gauge

The SNCF TGV Réseau (lit. 'Network', TGV-R) is a TGV train built by Alstom between 1992 and 1996 for SNCF, the French national railway for use on high-speed TGV services. The Réseau trainsets are based on the earlier TGV Atlantique. The first Réseau sets entered service in 1993.

== Design ==
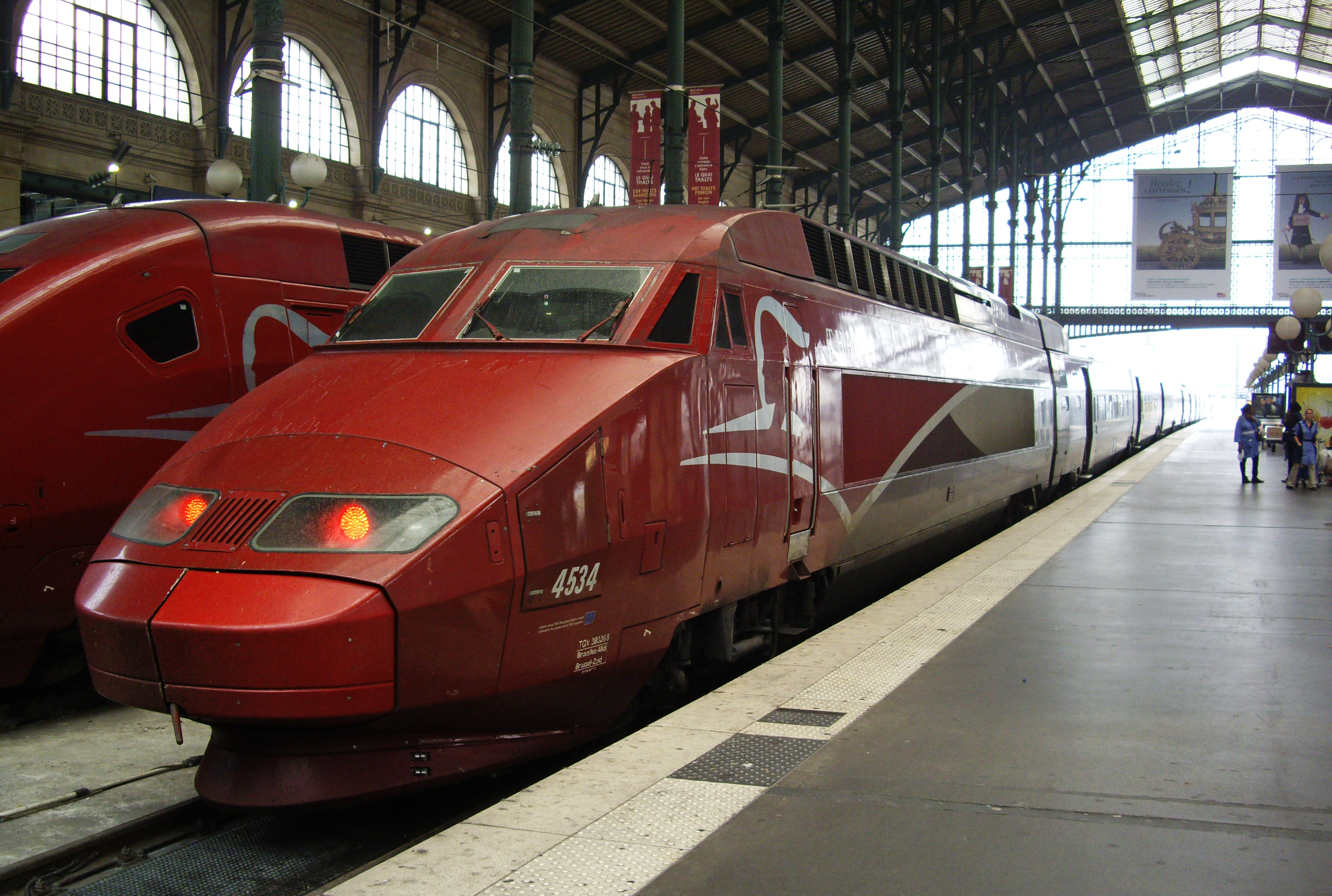
A Thalys PBA trainset in October 2012

Fifty dual-voltage trainsets were built in 1992–1994, numbered 501–550. A further 40 triple-voltage trainsets, numbered 4501–4540, were built in 1994–1996. The last ten of these triple voltage units are known as Thalys PBA (Paris–Brussels–Amsterdam) sets and were built for Thalys services, now branded as Eurostar. As well as using standard French voltages of 25 kV 50 Hz AC and 1,500 V DC (also used in the Netherlands), the triple voltage sets can operate under the Belgian and Italian 3,000 V DC supplies.

They are formed of two power cars (8,800 kW (11,801 hp) under 25 kV—like the TGV Atlantique) and eight carriages, giving a capacity of 377 seats. They have a top speed of 320 km/h (199 mph). They are 200.19 m (656 ft 9 1/2 in) long and are 2.904 m (9 ft 6 5/16 in) wide. The dual-voltage sets weigh 383 tonnes (844,370 lb), and owing to axle-load restrictions in Belgium the triple-voltage sets have a series of modifications, such as the replacement of steel with aluminium and hollow axles, to reduce the weight to under 17 t (16.7 long tons; 18.7 short tons) per axle. Owing to early complaints of uncomfortable pressure changes when entering tunnels at high speed on the LGV Atlantique, the Réseau sets are pressure-sealed.

In 2006 the carriages of nineteen sets were used to form TGV POS sets by using new TGV POS power cars for services on the LGV Est to Germany and Switzerland. The 38 Réseau power cars were slightly modified and joined to new Duplex carriages, forming nineteen TGV Réseau Duplex units. They now operate as part of the TGV Duplex fleet, being numbered 601–619.

== SNCF refurbishment ==
After some ten years of successful service, the interior of TGV Réseau sets became outdated and needed a refurbishment. This refurbishment was part of the TGV Est project, as the dual-voltage sets were to assure the domestic services there. The same interiors would also be used in the coaches for POS sets.

Three possible interiors were presented to the public between 2002 and 2003 in different stations:

- Recaro which teamed up with Brand Company (designer of the "snail" TGV logo)
- MBD Design (designer of the noses of Alstom's Prima locomotives and the TGV Duplex) which teamed up with fashion designer Christian Lacroix.
- Antolin which teamed up with Kenzo.

At the end of the Train Capitale exposition in Paris, MBD Design and Christian Lacroix were announced as the winning design.

Work started on the first dual-voltage sets in 2004 at SNCF's Hellemmes workshops, near Lille. In 2006 the last dual-voltage set was finished. Between 2008 and 2009 the three-voltage sets will also be refurbished in the same design. The refurbished sets can be distinguished from the non-refurbished ones by: the slightly changed livery; the fittings in the coaches, which are in new colours (red for 2nd class, yellow-green for 1st class and silver for the bar) and the reflecting stripes on the sides of the motorcars.

Although SNCF announced in July 2007 that the Lacroix-design would not be continued because some materials vibrated at 300 km/h (186 mph), this was later changed: the Lacroix-design will be applied to all TGV Réseau sets.

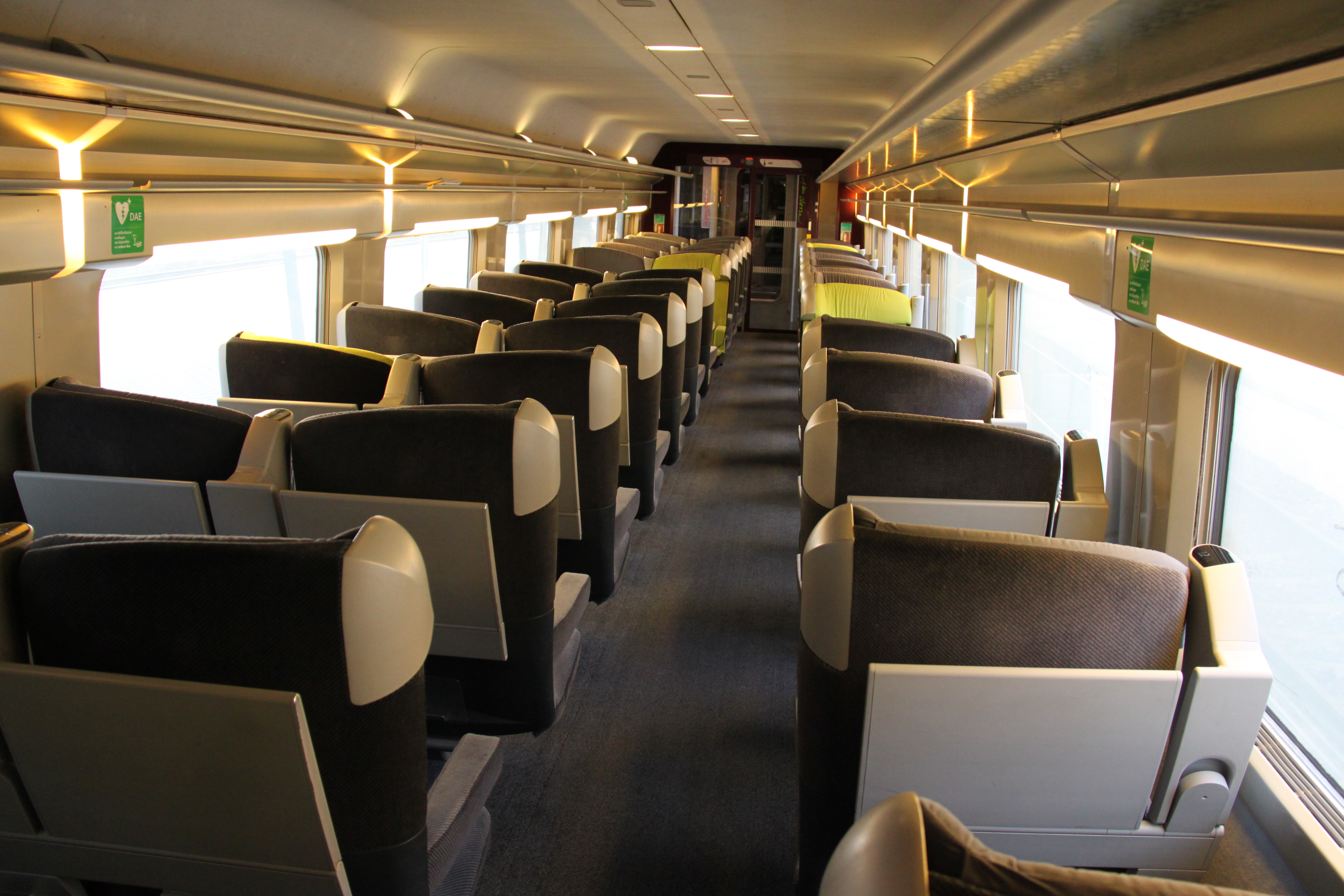
Refurbished 1st class interior

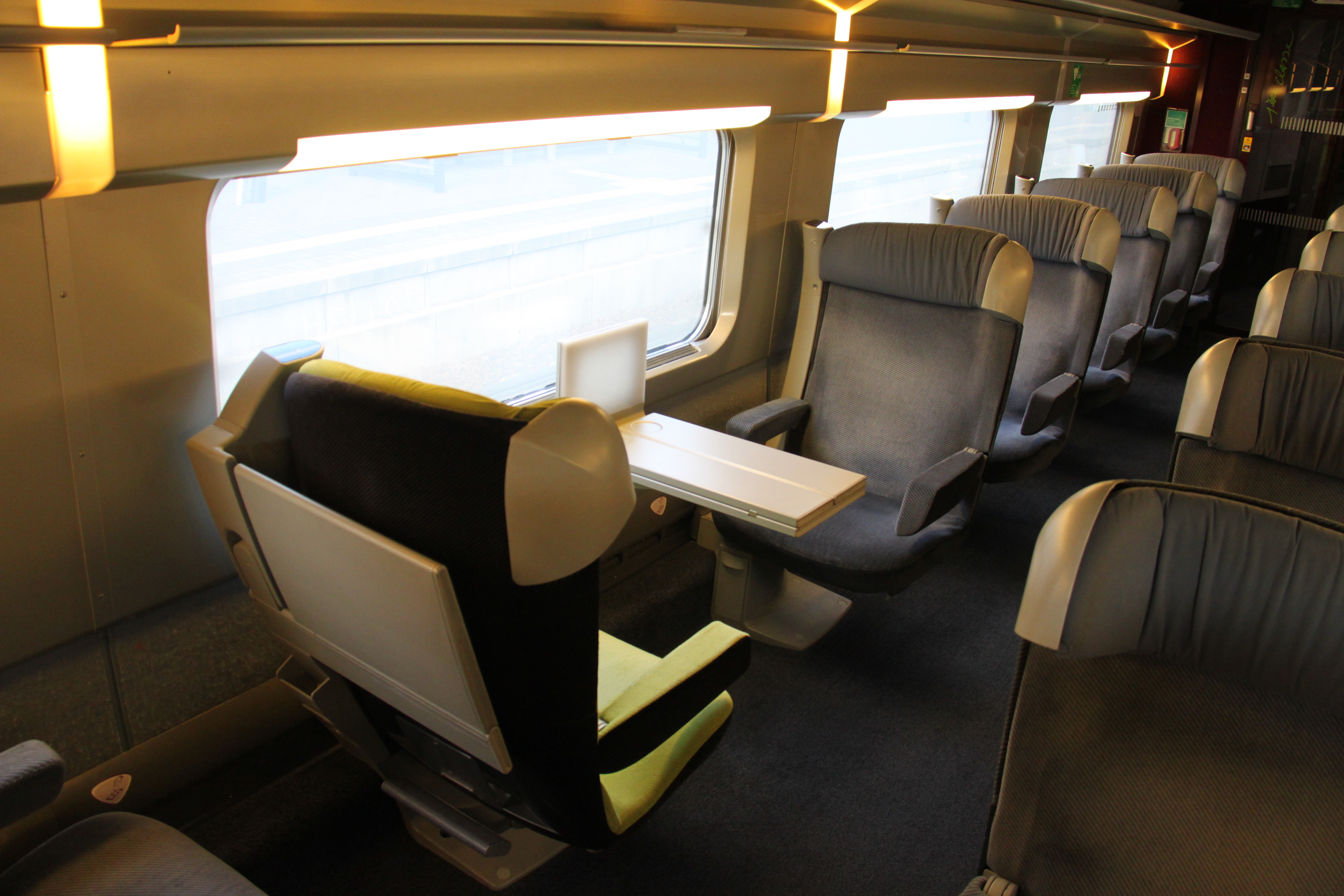
Refurbished 1st class interior

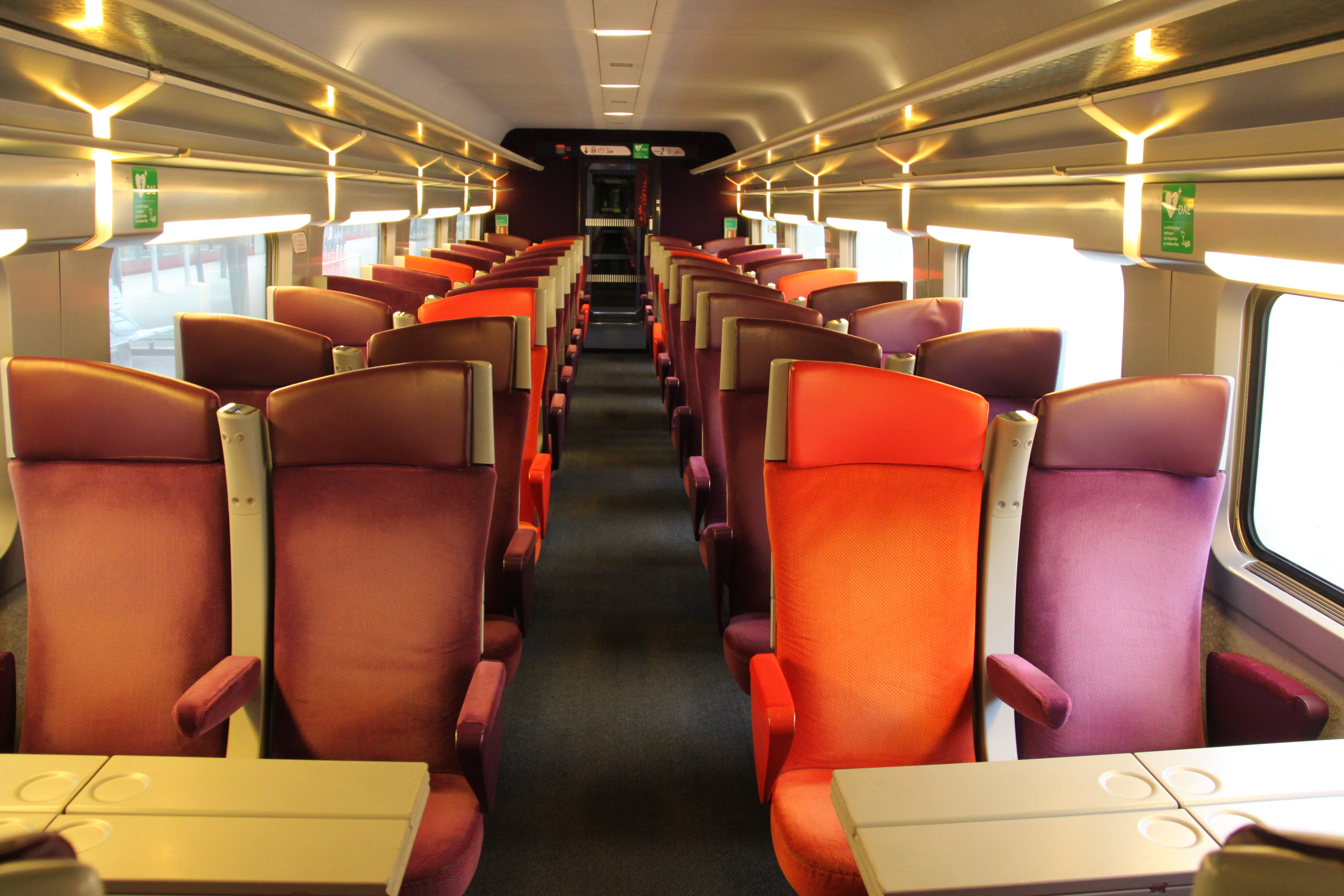
Refurbished 2nd class interior

== Fleet details ==
Class	Year built	Operator	Built	In service	Current Units	Notes
Series 28000	1992–1994	SNCF	50	30	501, 503–514, 534–550	Dual-voltage; 502 written off after accident 515–533 converted to Réseau Duplex.
Series 38000	1993–1996	SNCF	30	27	4501–4506, 4510–4529, 4551	Tri-voltage; 4530 converted to Iris 320
Series 38000	1993–1996	Eurostar	10	9	4532–4540	Tri-voltage; 4531 sold to SNCF, renumbered 4551

== See also ==
- List of high speed trains
- KTX-I — derived design used in Korea
