= Development of the TGV =

The TGV (French: Train à Grande Vitesse, high-speed train) is France's high-speed rail service. The idea of a high-speed train in France was born about twenty years before the first TGVs entered service. At that time, about 1960, a radical new concept was thought up; combining very high speeds and steep grades would allow a railway to follow the contours of existing terrain, like a gentle roller coaster. Instead of one or two percent grades which would be considered steep in normal applications, grades up to four percent would be feasible, thus allowing more flexible (and cheaper) routing of new lines. Over the next several years, this very general idea gave rise to a variety of high speed transportation concepts, which tended to move away from conventional "wheel on rail" vehicles. Indeed, the French government at the time favoured more "modern" air-cushioned or maglev trains, such as Bertin's Aérotrain; Steel wheel on rail was considered a dead-end technology. Simultaneously, SNCF (the French national railways) was trying to raise the speeds of conventional trains into the range 180 to 200 km/h (110 to 125 mph) for non-electrified sections, by using gas turbines for propulsion. Energy was reasonably cheap in those years, and gas turbines (originally designed for helicopters) were a compact and efficient way to fulfil requirements for more power. Following on the TGS prototype in 1967, SNCF introduced gas turbine propulsion with the ETG (Elément à Turbine à Gaz, or Gas Turbine Unit) turbotrains in Paris - Cherbourg service, in March 1970.

The desire for higher speeds and the successful development of the turbotrain program are two ideas that came together in the late 1960s, further spurred on by the 1964 start of the Japanese Shinkansen high-speed train. They were embodied in a joint program between SNCF and industry to explore the possibility of a high speed gas turbine unit. The project, initiated in 1967, was entitled "Rail Possibilities on New Infrastructures" and was code-named C03. The experimental X4300 TGS railcar, predecessor of the ETG, had been tested at speeds up to 252 km/h (157 mph) in October 1971, and gave promising results. Since the very high speed lines envisioned by SNCF called for speeds of 250 km/h to 300 km/h (155 mph to 186 mph), SNCF had Alsthom-Atlantique build a special high speed turbotrain prototype to test out some concepts in high speed rail. Thus was born the turbotrain TGV 001, standing for Train à Grande Vitesse, or High Speed Train 001.

== The TGV 001 Turbotrain ==
The TGV 001 turbotrain was a test train for a vast research program encompassing traction, vehicle dynamics, braking, aerodynamics, signalling, and other technologies that needed to be developed to allow higher speeds. Only one was ever built, although it was originally planned to build a second version equipped with an active tilt system. The studies for the tilting version were completed, but it never reached construction because of technical difficulties with fitting the tilt system.

The TGV 001 consisted of two power cars with three trailers in between, the whole trainset permanently coupled together. All axles were powered by electric motors, with the advantage of low axle loads and a high power-to-weight ratio. Electric traction also made possible dynamic braking, especially effective at high speeds. Each power car had a pair of turbines (the TURMO IIIG and then the TURMO X, used in Sud Aviation's Super Frelon helicopter) which ran at constant speed. They were connected to a reductor stage, whose output shaft drove an alternator. Besides the turbine drive, the power cars had control gear for the traction motors, dynamic brake grids, signalling and braking equipment, etc.

The TGV001 was articulated, with adjacent vehicles riding on a common truck. This afforded a greater stability (by coupling the dynamics of carbodies) and made space for a pneumatic secondary suspension placed level with the centre of gravity, thus reducing roll in curves. In 5227 test runs covering almost half a million kilometres, the TGV 001 turbotrain exceeded 300 km/h (186 mph) on 175 runs and reached a top speed of 318 km/h (198 mph) on 8 December 1972. This was (and still is) the world speed record for a non-electric train. The TGV 001 test campaign was an invaluable part of project C03, proving new concepts in a realistic environment and giving extensive engineering data on high-speed operation.

== Electric power ==
With the oil crisis of 1973, it no longer seemed economically viable to power the future high-speed train with fossil fuels. The requirements were changed to fully electric operation, which resulted in an extensive redesign and test program. In April 1974, the Z7001 experimental electric railcar, nicknamed "Zébulon", began trials. Zébulon was rebuilt from the Z7115 which had been wrecked. Using this vehicle, the new Y226 long-wheelbase power truck (precursor of the Y230 of the production TGV) was developed and tested, with its body-mounted traction motors and tripod cardan transmission. Body mounting of the traction motors was a major innovation; it allowed a considerable (3300 kg) reduction in the mass of the power truck, giving it a very high critical speed and exceptional tracking stability. Zébulon also served to develop a two-stage high speed pantograph, which later became the AM-PSE pantograph of the TGV Sud-Est, as well as a new type of eddy current rail brake. The eddy current rail brake exerts a magnetic retention effort, without ever making contact with the rail. The promise of high efficiency and low wear was however outweighed by problems with overheating in the rail, and the design was dropped. Zébulon's suspension, of a non-pneumatic design, was completely satisfactory so it was adopted for the new high speed train, instead of the TGV 001's pneumatic suspension.

Over a period of 20 months, Zébulon racked up almost a million kilometres, 25000 of which were run at speeds over 300 km/h (186 mph). The highest speed reached by Zébulon was 309 km/h (192 mph). Prospects were good for project C03, which was fully funded by the French government in 1976. Construction of an electric high-speed line from Paris to Lyon began soon after.

== Styling: something new and different ==
The styling of the original TGV, inside and out, is due to industrial designer Jacques Cooper. He was born in Britain in 1931, before moving to France. In the mid-1950s, he spent several years working under American designer Raymond Loewy, whose most famous designs included the Pennsylvania Railroad's GG1 electric locomotive. As early as 1968, when he began working for Alsthom, Jacques Cooper was asked to draw up a "train that didn't look like a train". He designed the TGV 001 turbotrain's look, inside and out, and soon thereafter the TGV design was born. As early as 1975, Cooper was drawing trains that resembled the TGV Duplex of twenty years later. While Cooper's design for the train's exterior was immediately accepted, he was sent back to the drawing board numerous times while trying to come up with the interior design, which included everything from seats to door handles.

The many design requirements were sometimes in conflict, and Cooper had to find an optimal solution. The interior spaces had to be welcoming and comfortable, restful, quiet, easy to clean and fix, and smoothly integrated together to create a uniform atmosphere. Comfort was to be made accessible to all passengers while retaining a certain status and flair. The overarching aim was to design an interior space that was both relaxing and enjoyable.

By the late seventies, the design of the first TGV was complete. The first batch of production trainsets was ordered on 4 November 1976. Over the next twenty years, over 600 copies of Cooper's world-famous TGV nose would be built.

== Last-minute issues ==
On 28 July 1978, two pre-production TGV trainsets left the Alsthom factory in Belfort. These would later become TGV Sud-Est trainsets 01 and 02, but for testing purposes they had been nicknamed "Patrick" and "Sophie", after their radio callsigns. In the following months of testing, over 15,000 modifications were made to these trainsets, which were far from trouble-free. High-speed vibration was a particularly difficult problem to root out: the new trains were not at all comfortable at cruising speed. The solution was slow in coming, and slightly delayed the schedule. Eventually it was found that inserting rubber blocks under the primary suspension springs took care of the problem. Other difficulties with high-speed stability of the trucks were overcome by 1980, when the first segment of the new line from Paris to Lyon was originally supposed to open. The first production trainset, number 03, was delivered on 25 April 1980.

Delivery of an order for 87 TGV trainsets was well underway in 1981, when trainset 16 was used for a very publicized world record run, code-named operation TGV 100 (for a target speed of 100 metres per second, or 360 km/h). The target was exceeded on 26 February 1981, when trainset 16 reached a speed of 380 kilometres per hour (236 mph) in perfect safety. This was quite in contrast with the previous record of 331 kilometres per hour (206 mph), set on 28 March 1955 by a pair of French electric locomotives, the CC 7107 and the BB 9004. In those record attempts, which some would call suicidal, the track was severely damaged and the trains came dangerously close to derailing.

On 27 September 1981, to great fanfare, the first TGV with paying passengers left Paris, after the inauguration by then French president François Mitterrand five days earlier. Thus began the long tradition of high-speed ground transportation in France.
