= High-speed rail in Europe =

Operational high-speed lines in Europe

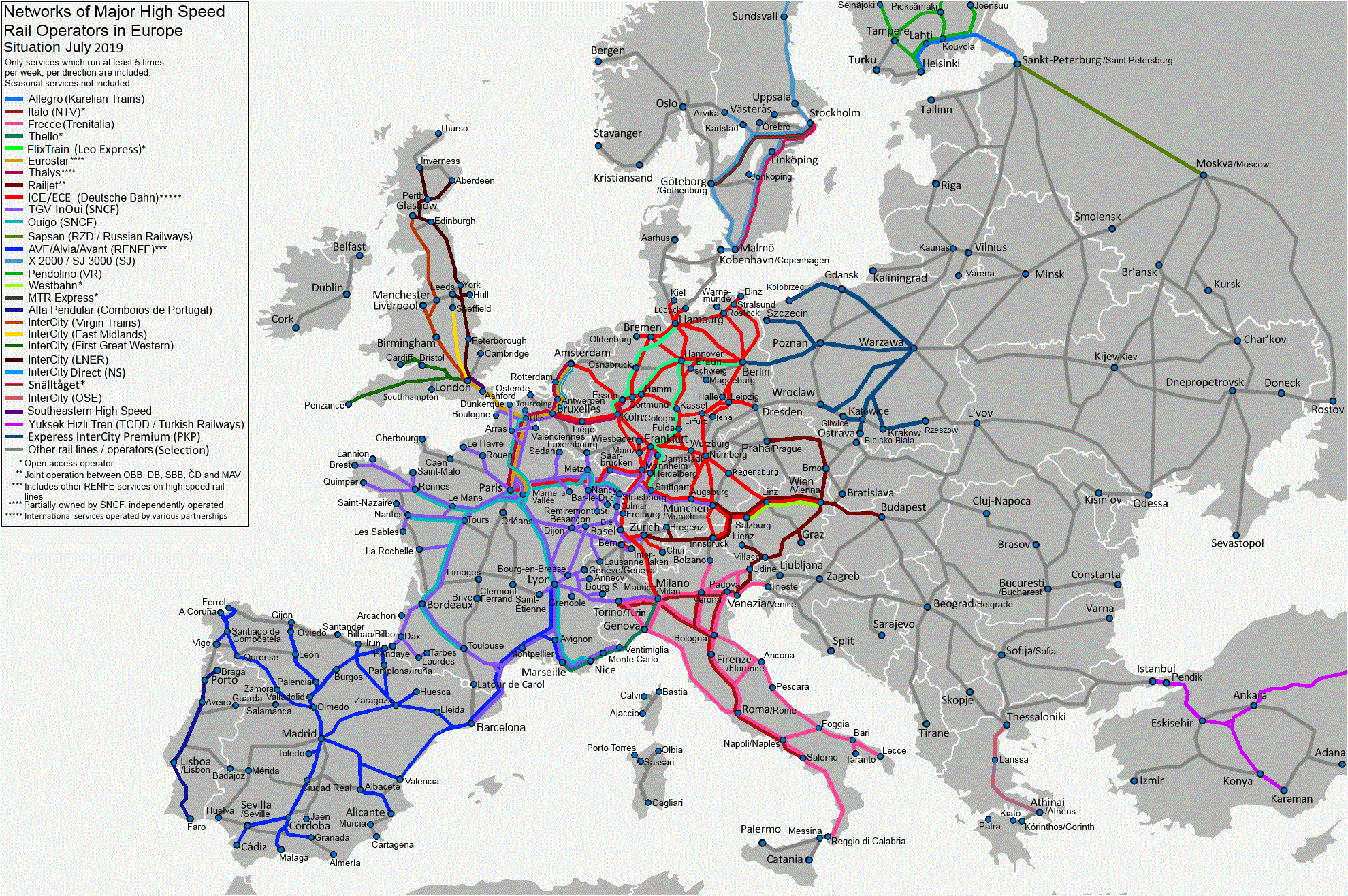
Networks of major high-speed rail operators in Europe, 2019

High-speed rail (HSR) has developed in Europe as an increasingly popular and efficient means of transport. The first high-speed rail lines on the continent, built in the late 20th century, improved travel times on intra-national corridors. Since then, several countries have built extensive high-speed networks, and there are now several cross-border high-speed rail links.

As of 2025, several European countries — among them France, Spain, Italy, Germany, Austria, Belgium, the Netherlands, and the United Kingdom — are connected to a cross-border high-speed railway network. Spain operates the largest high-speed rail network in Europe with 3,973 km (2,469 mi) and the second-largest in the world, trailing only China. High-speed rail in the region predominantly runs in Western Europe, with comparatively very few high-speed lines having been built in Eastern Europe.

The earliest European high-speed railway to be built was the Italian Florence–Rome high-speed railway (also called "Direttissima"), which opened in 1977. In 2007, a consortium of European Railway operators, Railteam, emerged to coordinate and boost cross-border high-speed rail travel. Developing a Trans-European high-speed rail network is a stated goal of the European Union, and most cross-border railway lines receive EU funding. Alstom was the first manufacturer to design and deliver a high-speed train, which entered service as the TGV in France. Currently, there are several manufacturers involved in designing and building HSR in Europe, with alliances and partnerships, including Alstom, Bombardier (owned by Alstom since 2021), Hitachi, Siemens, and Talgo.

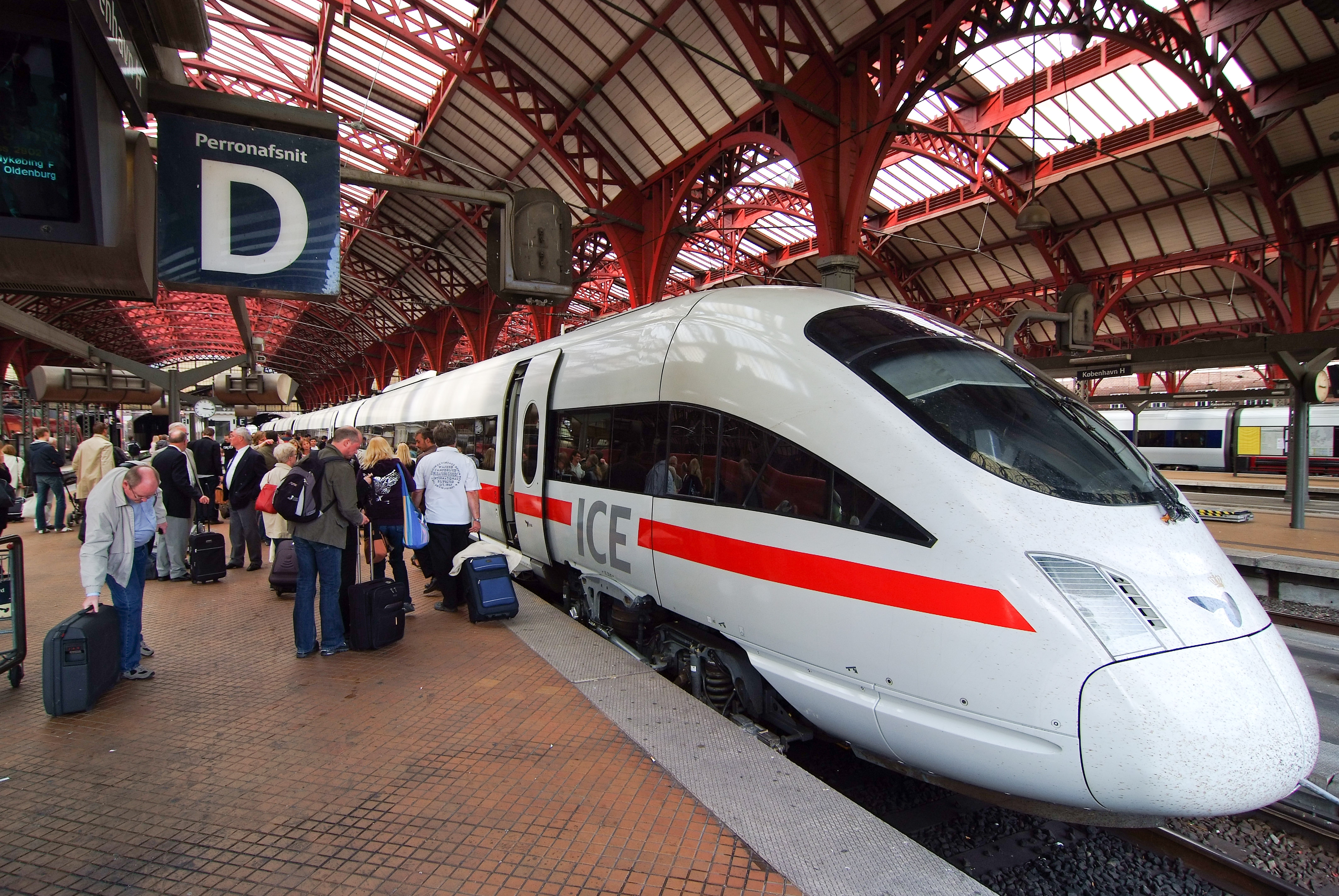
A German ICE high-speed train at Copenhagen Central Station.

== Early national high-speed rail networks ==
The first high-speed rail lines and services were built in the 1980s and 1990s as national projects. Countries sought to increase passenger capacity and decrease journey times on inter-city routes within their borders. In the beginning, lines were built through national funding programs and services were operated by national operators.

View chart definition.
Evolution of length of sections of lines designed for trains that can go faster than 250 km/h (155 mph), via the European Union, Union Internationale des Chemins de Fer
View chart definition.
Length of sections of lines designed for trains that can go faster than 250 km/h (155 mph) by country, via the European Union, Union Internationale des Chemins de Fer

=== Italy ===
==== Early developments ====
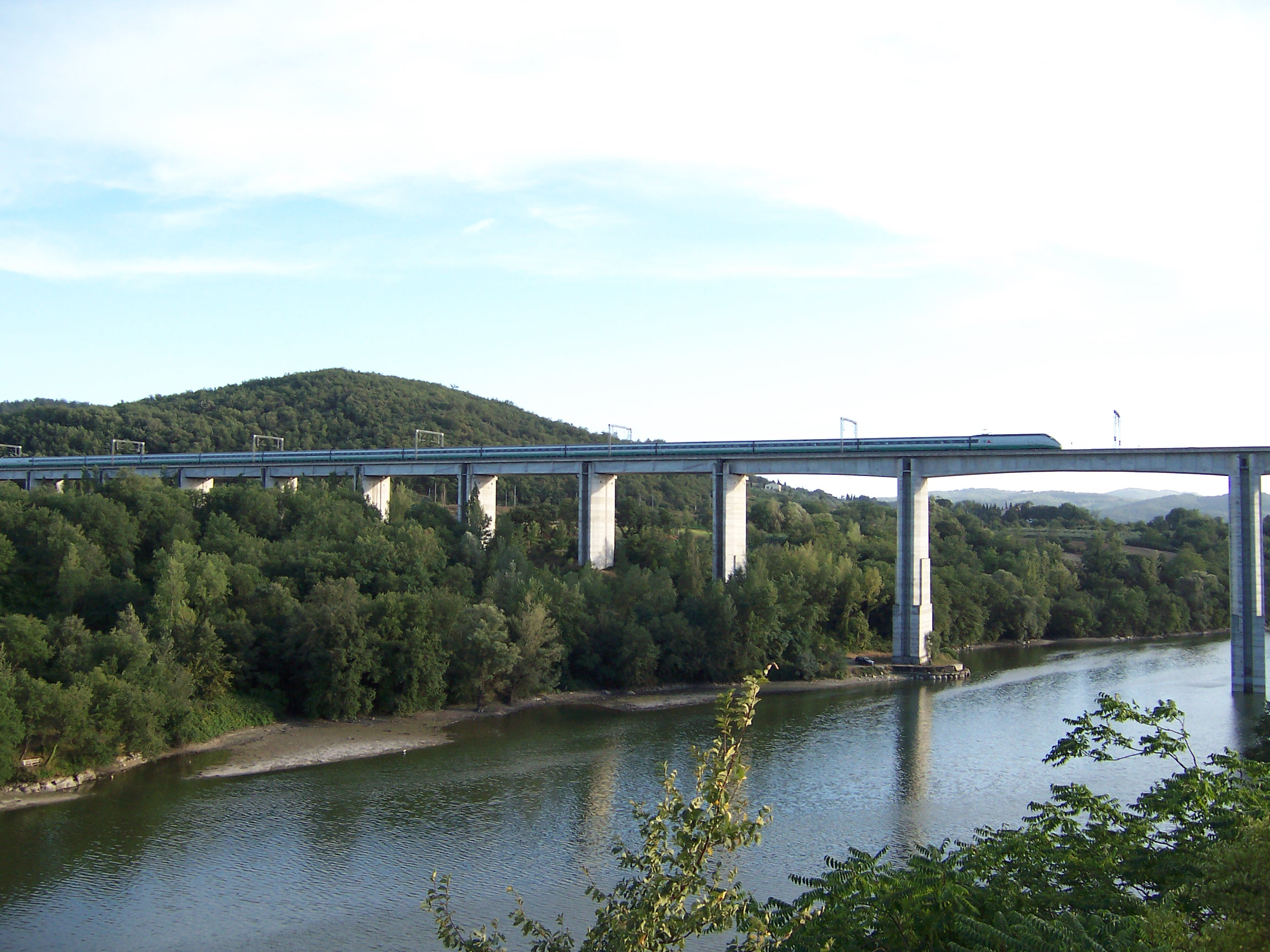
An ETR 500 train running on the Florence–Rome high-speed line near Arezzo, Italy, the first high-speed railway opened in Europe

The earliest high-speed rail line built in Europe was the Italian "Direttissima", the Florence–Rome high-speed railway 254 km (158 mi) in 1977. The top speed on the line was 250 km/h (160 mph), giving an end-to-end journey time of about 90 minutes with an average speed of 200 km/h (120 mph). This line used a 3 kV DC supply.

High-speed service was introduced on the Rome-Milan line in 1988–89 with the ETR 450 Pendolino train, with a top speed of 250 km/h (160 mph) and cutting travel times from about 5 hours to 4. The prototype train ETR X 500 was the first Italian train to reach 300 km/h (190 mph) on the Direttissima on 25 May 1989.

In November 2018, the first high-speed freight rail in the world commenced service in Italy. The ETR 500 Mercitalia Fast train carries freight between Caserta and Bologna in 3 hours and 30 minutes, at an average speed of 180 km/h (110 mph).

The Italian government constructor Treno Alta Velocità has been adding to the high-speed network in Italy, with some lines already opened. The Italian operator NTV is the first open access high-speed rail operator in Europe, since 2011, using AGV ETR 575 multiple units.

In March 2011, a contract for the second phase of construction on the Milan–Verona high-speed line was signed. This section will be 39 km (24 mi) long. Construction was originally to be completed by 2015, it is open to Brescia from late 2016.

==== Current network and projects ====
Line	Operating speed (max)	Length	Construction began	Construction completed or expected start of revenue services
Florence–Rome	250 km/h (155 mph)	254 km (158 mi)	1970	1992
Rome–Naples	300 km/h (186 mph)	205 km (127 mi)	1995	2005
Padua–Venice (Mestre)	220 km/h (137 mph)	25 km (16 mi)		2007
Naples-Salerno	250 km/h (155 mph)	29 km (18 mi)		2008
Milan–Bologna	300 km/h (186 mph)	215 km (134 mi)	2002	2008
Bologna–Florence	300 km/h (186 mph)	79 km (49 mi)	1992	2009
Turin–Milan	300 km/h (186 mph)	125 km (78 mi)		2009
Milan–Brescia	300 km/h (186 mph)	67 km (42 mi)	2012	2016
Brescia-Verona	250 km/h (155 mph)	48 km (30 mi)	2016	2026
Verona-Vicenza	250 km/h (155 mph)	44 km (27 mi)	2021	2026
Vicenza Crossing	160 km/h (99 mph)	6 km (3.7 mi)		2032
Vicenza-Padua	250 km/h (155 mph)	42 km (26 mi)	2024	2029
Brenner Base Tunnel	250 km/h (155 mph)	56 km (35 mi)	2006	2032
Turin-Lyon	250 km/h (155 mph)	72 km (45 mi)	2011	2030
Verona-Brenner	250 km/h (155 mph)	180 km (110 mi)	2021	2032
Milano-Genoa	250 km/h (155 mph)	53 km (33 mi)	2011	2029
Naples-Bari	250 km/h (155 mph)	147 km (91 mi)	2016	2027
Florence rail bypass	100 km/h (62 mph)	8 km (5.0 mi)	2023	2028
Palermo–Catania–Messina high-speed railway	250 km/h (155 mph)	67 km (42 mi)	2018	2029

The table shows minimum and maximum (depending on stops) travel times.

	Bologna	Florence	Milan	Naples	Rome	Turin
Bologna	-	0:35	0:53	3:15 (3:35)	1:54 (2:03)	2:02
Florence	0:35	-	1:31	2:31 (2:51)	1:18 (1:45)	2:38
Milan	0:53	1:31	-	3:50 (4:18)	2:40 (3:08)	0:44 (1:00)
Naples	3:15 (3:35)	2:31 (2:51)	3:50 (4:18)	-	1:08	5:00 (5:25)
Rome	1:54 (2:35)	1:18 (1:45)	2:40 (3:08)	1:08	-	3:48
Turin	2:02	2:38	0:44 (1:00)	5:00 (5:25)	3:48	-

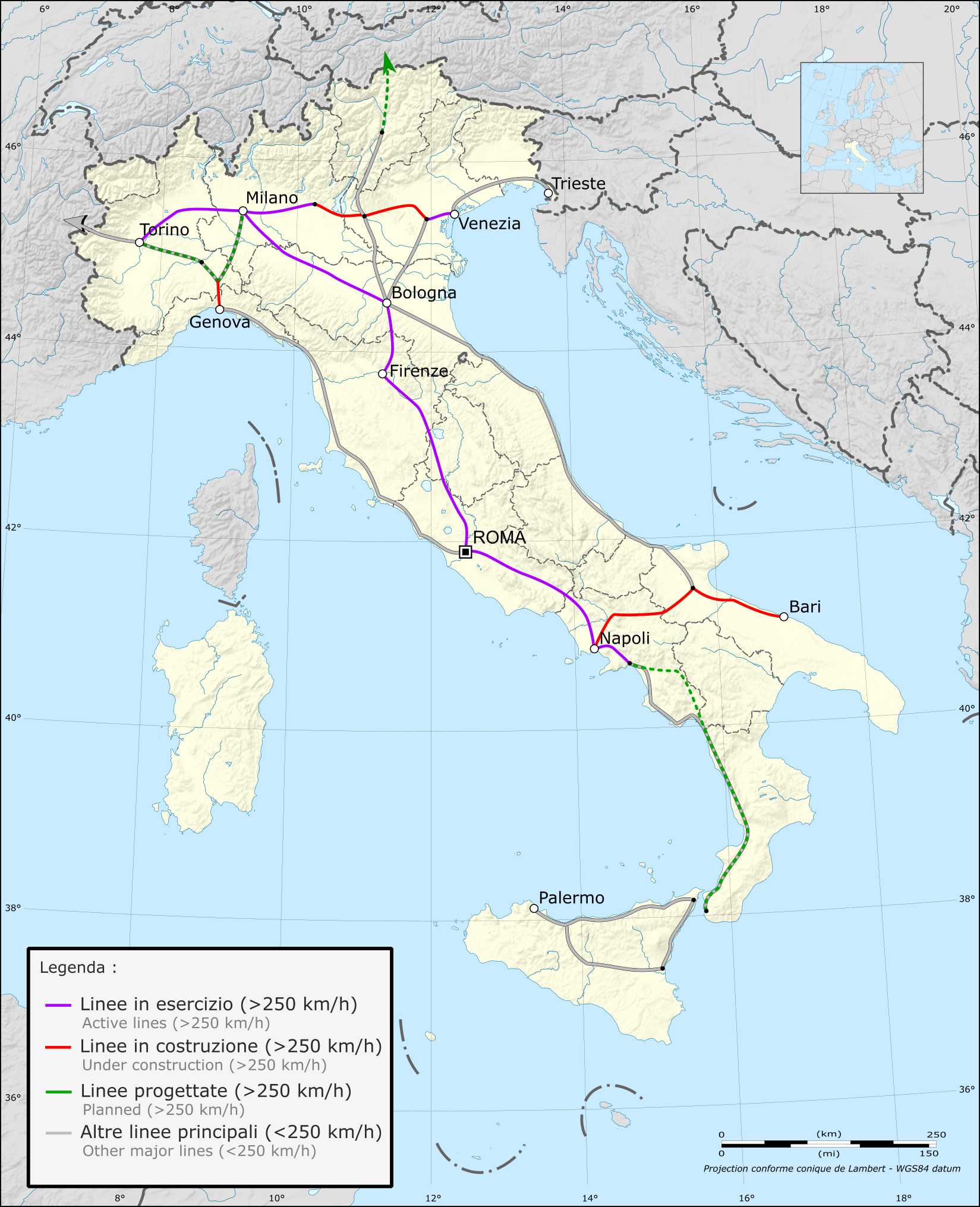
Map of Italian high-speed and higher speed rail network

The Italian high-speed railway network consists of 1,342 km (834 mi) of lines, which allow speeds of up to 300 km/h (186 mph). The safety system adopted for the network is the ERMTS/ETCS II, the state-of-the-art in railway signalling and safety. The power supply follows the European standard of 25 kV AC 50 Hz mono-phase current. The Direttissima segment is still supplied with 3 kV DC current, but it is planned that this will be conformed to the rest of the network.

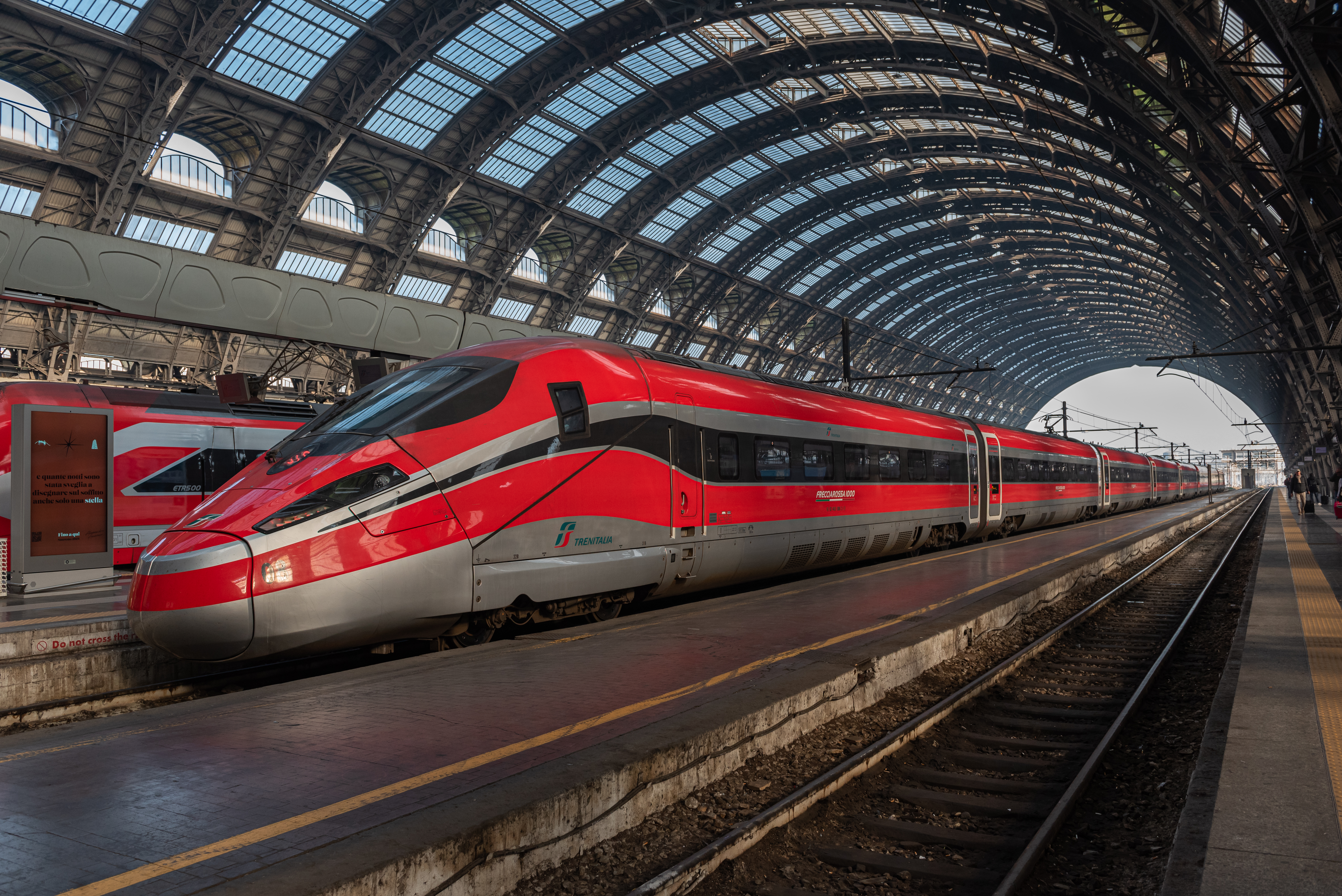
FS' Frecciarossa 1000 high speed train at Milano Centrale railway station, with a maximum speed of 400 km/h (249 mph), is one of the fastest trains in Europe.

FS' ETR 600 high speed train at Venezia Santa Lucia railway station. Its design comes from Giorgetto Giugiaro.

With the entering into service of the ETR1000 train-sets, which have a designed top speed of 400 km/h (248.5 mph) and a designed commercial speed of 360 km/h (223.7 mph), the rail network speeds where thought to be upgraded to safely allow trains to run at such speeds. After it entered in service in 2015, the Frecciarossa 1000 underwent several speed tests along the Turin-Milan route, reaching the Italian rail speed record of 393.8 km/h (244.7 mph) on 26 February 2016. On 28 May 2018, the Italian Ministry of Infrastructure and Transport and the ANSF announced that no further tests will be carried out, as issues of ballast being suctioned by the train emerged at those speeds, and that the speed limit would be maintained at 300 km/h (186.4 mph), which is the speed for which it is currently certified.

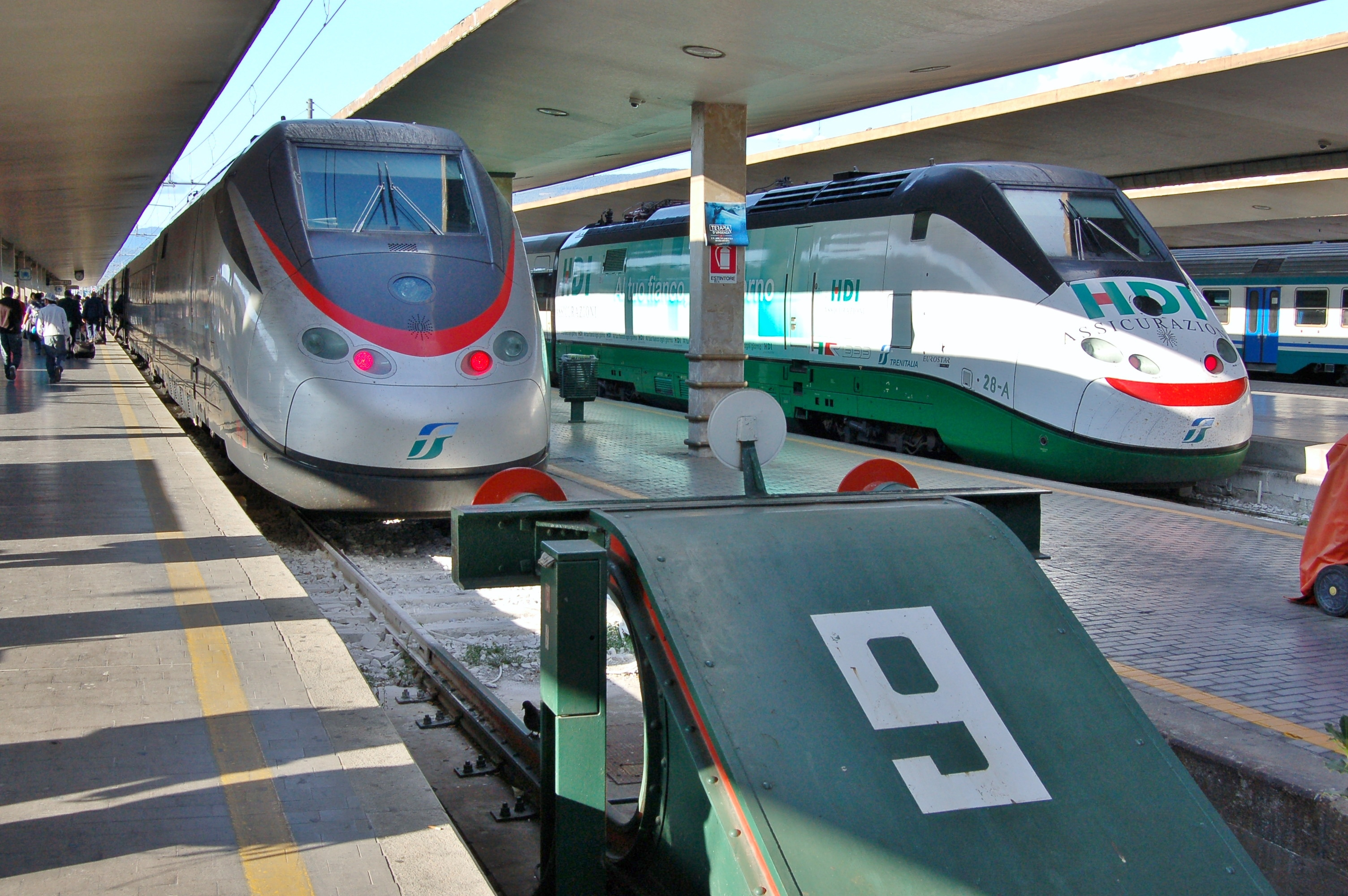
A pair of FS' ETR 500 at Firenze Santa Maria Novella railway station. The version ETR 500 Y1 achieved 362 km/h (225 mph) on the Bologna-Florence line on 4 February 2009, a new world speed record in a tunnel.

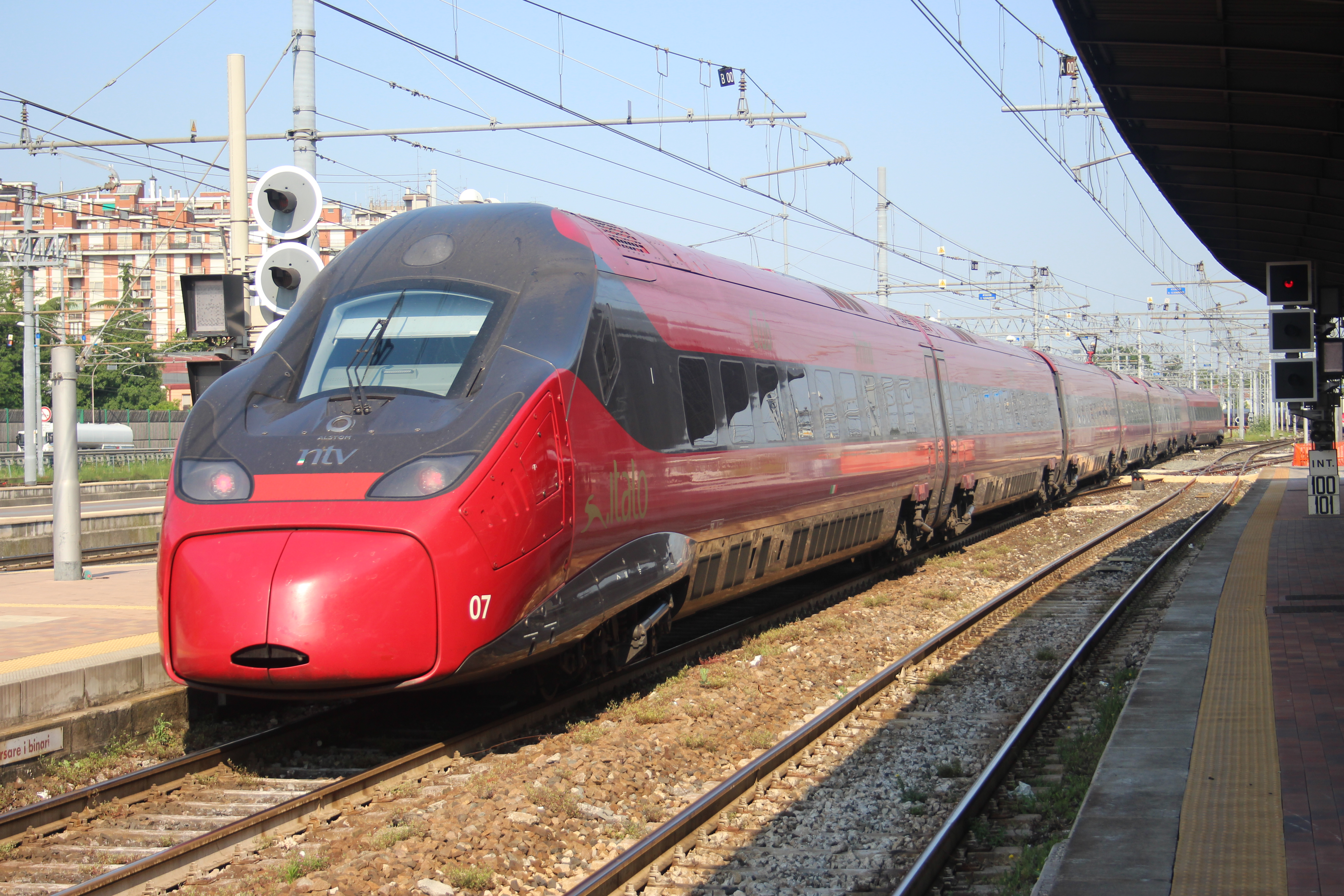
ETR 675 Italo EVO (NTV) at Venezia Mestre railway station

Service on the high speed lines is provided by Trenitalia and the privately owned NTV. Several types of high-speed trains carry out the service:

- AGV 575: non-tilting, it can reach 360 km/h (220 mph) and has an operational speed of up to 300 km/h (190 mph), operated by NTV as Italo;
- ETR 500: non-tilting, it can reach 360 km/h, operational speeds up to 300 km/h (190 mph), operated by Trenitalia as the Frecciarossa;
- ETR 1000: non-tilting, operated by Trenitalia as the Frecciarossa 1000, it can reach 400 km/h (250 mph) and has operational speed of 300 km/h (190 mph).
- ETR 485, tilting, speeds up to 250 km/h (160 mph), operated by Trenitalia as the Frecciargento. It operates mainly on traditional lines;
- ETR 600, tilting, speeds up to 250 km/h (160 mph), operated by Trenitalia as the Frecciarossa. It operates on routes that include relatively important sections on traditional lines, but also high-speed ones;
- ETR 610: tilting, speeds up to 250 km/h (160 mph), operated by Trenitalia on EuroCity trains between Italy and Switzerland together with Giruno trainsets;
- ETR 675: non-tilting, operated by NTV as Italo;
- ETR 700: non-tilting, speeds up to 250 km/h (160 mph), operated by Trenitalia as Frecciarossa mostly on routes consisting of sections on both traditional and high-speed lines.

Current limitations on the tracks set the maximum operating speed of the trains at 300 km/h (186 mph) after plans for 360 km/h (224 mph) operations were cancelled. Development of the ETR 1000 by AnsaldoBreda and Bombardier Transportation (which is designed to operate commercially at 360 km/h (224 mph), with a technical top speed of over 400 km/h (249 mph), is proceeding, with Rete Ferroviaria Italiana working on the necessary updates to allow trains to speed up to 360 km/h (224 mph). On 28 May 2018, the Ministry for Infrastructures and Transportation and the National Association for Railway Safety decided not to run the 385 km/h (239 mph) tests required to allow commercial operation at 350 km/h (217 mph), thus limiting the maximum commercial speed on the existing Italian high-speed lines to 300 km/h (186 mph) and cancelling the project. TGV trains also run on the Paris-Turin-Milan service, but do not use any high-speed line in Italy.

In the 1990s, work started on the Treno Alta Velocità (TAV) project, which involved building a new high-speed network on the routes Milan – (Bologna–Florence–Rome–Naples) – Salerno, Turin – (Milan–Verona–Venice) – Trieste and Milan–Genoa. Most of the planned lines have already been opened, while international links with France, Switzerland, Austria and Slovenia are underway.

Most of the Rome–Naples line opened in December 2005, the Turin–Milan line partially opened in February 2006 and the Milan–Bologna line opened in December 2008. The remaining sections of the Rome–Naples and the Turin–Milan lines and the Bologna–Florence line were completed in December 2009. All these lines are designed for speeds up to 300 km/h (190 mph). Since then, it is possible to travel from Turin to Salerno (ca. 950 km (590 mi)) in less than 5 hours. More than 100 trains per day are operated. Construction of the Milan-Venice high-speed line has begun in 2013 and in 2016 the Milan-Treviglio section has been opened to passenger traffic; the Milan-Genoa high-speed line (Terzo Valico dei Giovi) is also under construction.

Other proposed high-speed lines are Salerno-Reggio Calabria (connected to Sicily with the future bridge over the Strait of Messina), Palermo-Catania and Naples–Bari.

The main public operator of high-speed trains (alta velocità AV, formerly Eurostar Italia) is Trenitalia, part of FSI. Trains are divided into three categories (called "Le Frecce"): Frecciarossa ("Red arrow") trains operate at a maximum of 300 km/h (185 mph) on dedicated high-speed tracks; Frecciargento (Silver arrow) trains operate at a maximum of 250 km/h (155 mph) on both high-speed and mainline tracks; Frecciabianca (White arrow) trains operate at a maximum of 200 km/h (125 mph) on mainline tracks only.

The increasing success of Italy's high-speed rail networks since 2008 has been cited as one of the main reasons that the flag carrier airline Alitalia, which focused on domestic flights, went bankrupt and ceased operations in October 2021 as high-speed train travel became faster, cheaper and more efficient.

=== France ===
High-speed rail in France and bordering countries

Video footage of TGV, Thalys and Eurostar rushing past in France (2018)

France was the second country to introduce high-speed rail in Europe when the LGV Sud-Est from Paris to Lyon opened in 1981 and TGV started passenger service. Since then, France has continued to build an extensive network, with lines extending in every direction from Paris. France has the second largest high-speed network in Europe, with 2,800 km (1,740 mi) of operative HSR lines in June 2021, behind only Spain's 3,973 km (2,469 mi).

The TGV network gradually spread out to other cities, and into other countries such as Switzerland, Belgium, the Netherlands, Germany, and the UK. Due to the early adoption of high-speed rail and the important location of France (between the Iberian Peninsula, the British Isles and Central Europe), most other dedicated high-speed rail lines in Europe have been built to the same speed, voltage and signaling standards. The most obvious exception is the high-speed lines in Germany, which are built to existing German railway standards. Also, many high-speed services, including TGV and ICE utilize existing rail lines in addition to those designed for high-speed rail. For that reason, and due to differing national standards, trains that cross national boundaries need to have special characteristics, such as the ability to handle different power supplies and signalling systems. This means that not all TGVs are the same, and there are loading gauge and signalling considerations.

Line	Connected cities/stations	Opened	Operating speed (max)
North corridor
LGV Nord	Paris-Nord · Péronne · Arras · Lille-Europe · Calais	1993	300 km/h (190 mph)
LGV Interconnexion Est	Aéroport Charles de Gaulle · Marne-la-Vallée–Chessy	1994	300 km/h (190 mph)
South-west corridor
LGV Atlantique	Paris-Montparnasse · Massy	1989	300 km/h (190 mph)
LGV Atlantique	Southern branch: Vendôme · Tours Western branch: Le Mans	1990	300 km/h (190 mph)
LGV Sud Europe Atlantique	Poitiers · Angoulême · Bordeaux-Saint-Jean	2017	320 km/h (200 mph)
LGV Bretagne-Pays de la Loire	Sablé-sur-Sarthe · Laval · Rennes	2017	320 km/h (200 mph)
South-east corridor
LGV Sud-Est	Paris-Lyon · Le Creusot · Mâcon · Lyon-Part-Dieu	1981	300 km/h (190 mph)
LGV Rhône-Alpes	Lyon-Saint-Exupéry · Valence	1992	300 km/h (190 mph)
LGV Méditerranée	Avignon · Aix-en-Provence · Marseille-Saint-Charles	2001	320 km/h (200 mph)
LGV Rhin-Rhône	Besançon · Belfort	2011	320 km/h (200 mph)
LGV Nîmes – Montpellier	Nîmes · Montpellier	2018	220 km/h (140 mph)
LGV Perpignan–Figueres	Perpignan · Figueres–Vilafant	2010	320 km/h (200 mph)
East corridor
LGV Est	Paris-Est · Bezannes · Les Trois-Domaines · Louvigny	2007	320 km/h (200 mph)
LGV Est	Vendenheim · Strasbourg-Ville	2016	320 km/h (200 mph)
Future lines
Line and length	Construction began	Construction completed or expected start of revenue services	Operating speed (max)
LGV Bordeaux-Toulouse 222 km (138 mi)	2024	2030	320 km/h (200 mph)
LGV Bordeaux-Spain 222 km (138 mi)	Unknown	~ 2032	320 km/h (200 mph)
LGV Montpellier-Perpignan 150 km (93 mi)	2030	2035	Unknown
Lyon-Turin; 272 km (169 mi)	2007	2032	300 km/h (190 mph)

=== Germany ===
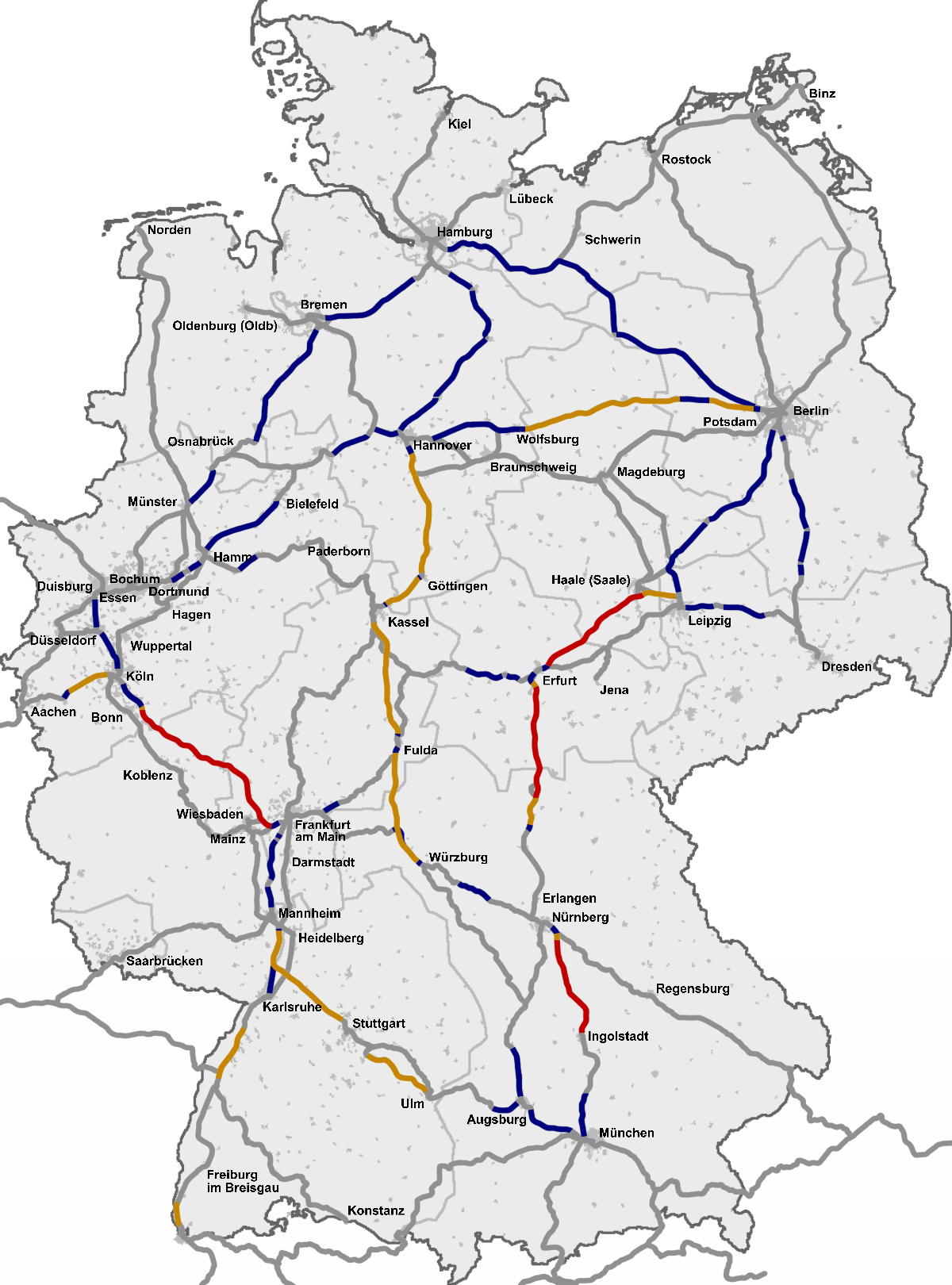
ICE network

Following the ETR 450 and Direttissima in Italy and French TGV, in 1991 Germany was the third country in Europe to inaugurate a high-speed rail service, with the launch of the Intercity-Express (ICE) on the new Hannover–Würzburg high-speed railway, operating at a top speed of 280 km/h (170 mph). The ICE network is more tightly integrated with pre-existing lines and trains as a result of the different settlement structure in Germany, with more than twice the population density of France. ICE trains reached destinations in Austria and Switzerland soon after they entered service, taking advantage of the same voltage used in these countries. Starting in 2000, multisystem third-generation ICE trains entered the Netherlands and Belgium. The third generation of the ICE reached a speed of 363 km/h (226 mph) during trial runs in accordance with European rules requiring maximum speed +10% in trial runs, and is certified for 330 km/h (205 mph) in regular service. Germany has around 1,658 kilometers (1,030 miles) of high speed lines.

In the south-west, a new line between Offenburg and Basel is planned to allow speeds of 250 km/h (155 mph), and a new line between Frankfurt and Mannheim for speeds of 300 km/h (186 mph) is in advanced planning stages. In the east, a 230 km (143 mi) long line between Nuremberg and Leipzig opened in December 2017 for speeds of up to 300 km/h (186 mph). Together with the fast lines from Berlin to Leipzig and from Nuremberg to Munich, which were completed in 2006, it allows journey times of about four hours from Berlin in the north to Munich in the south, compared to nearly eight hours for the same distance a few years ago.

Line	Operating speed (max)	Length	Construction began	Construction completed or expected start of revenue services
Hanover–Würzburg high-speed railway	Normal: 250 km/h (155 mph); If delay: 280 km/h (175 mph)	327 km (203 mi)	1973	1991
Mannheim–Stuttgart high-speed railway	Normal: 250 km/h (155 mph); If delay: 280 km/h (175 mph)	99 km (62 mi)	1976	1991
Hanover–Berlin high-speed railway	Majority: 250 km/h (155 mph); Parts of the line: 300 km/h (190 mph) or 200 km/h (125 mph)	258 km (160 mi)	1992	1998
Cologne–Frankfurt high-speed rail line	Majority: 300 km/h (190 mph); Parts of the line: 200 km/h (125 mph)	180 km (112 mi)	1995	2002
Cologne–Aachen high-speed railway	250 km/h (155 mph)	70 km (43 mi)	1997	2002
Nuremberg–Munich high-speed railway	300 km/h (190 mph)	171 km (106 mi)	1998	2006–2013
Nuremberg–Erfurt high-speed railway	300 km/h (190 mph)	191 km (119 mi)	1996	2017
Erfurt–Leipzig/Halle high-speed railway	Majority: 300 km/h (190 mph); Parts of the line: 200 km/h (125 mph)	121 km (75 mi)	1987	2015
Karlsruhe–Basel high-speed railway	250 km/h (155 mph)	182 km (113 mi)	1987	1993–2031
Stuttgart–Wendlingen high-speed railway	250 km/h (155 mph)	25 km (16 mi)	2012	2025 (expected)
Wendlingen–Ulm high-speed railway	250 km/h (155 mph)	60 km (37 mi)	2012	2022

=== United Kingdom ===
==== Early developments ====
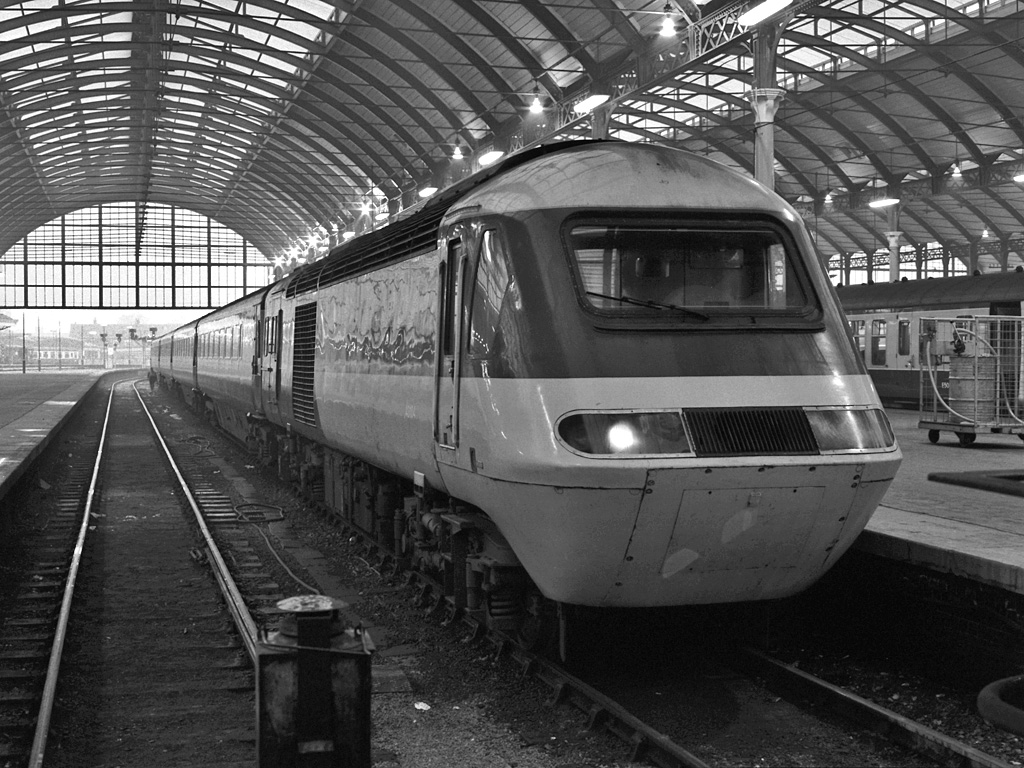
An InterCity 125 train at Hull Paragon in 1982. The InterCity 125 is the world's fastest diesel train.

Britain has a history of high-speed rail, starting with early high-speed steam systems: examples of engines are GWR 3700 Class 3440 City of Truro and the steam-record holder LNER Class A4 4468 Mallard. Later, high-speed diesel and electric services were introduced, using upgraded main lines, mainly the Great Western Main Line (GWML) and East Coast Main Line. The InterCity 125, otherwise known as the High-Speed Train (HST), was launched in 1976 with a service speed of 125 mph (201 km/h) and provided the first high-speed rail services in Britain. The HST was diesel-powered, and the GWML was the first to be modified for the new service. Because the GWML had been built mostly straight, often with four tracks and with a distance of 1 mi (1.6 km) between distant signal and main signal, it allowed trains to run at 125 mph (201 km/h) with relatively moderate infrastructure investments, compared to other countries in Europe. The Intercity 125 had proven the economic case for high-speed rail, and British Rail was keen to explore further advances.

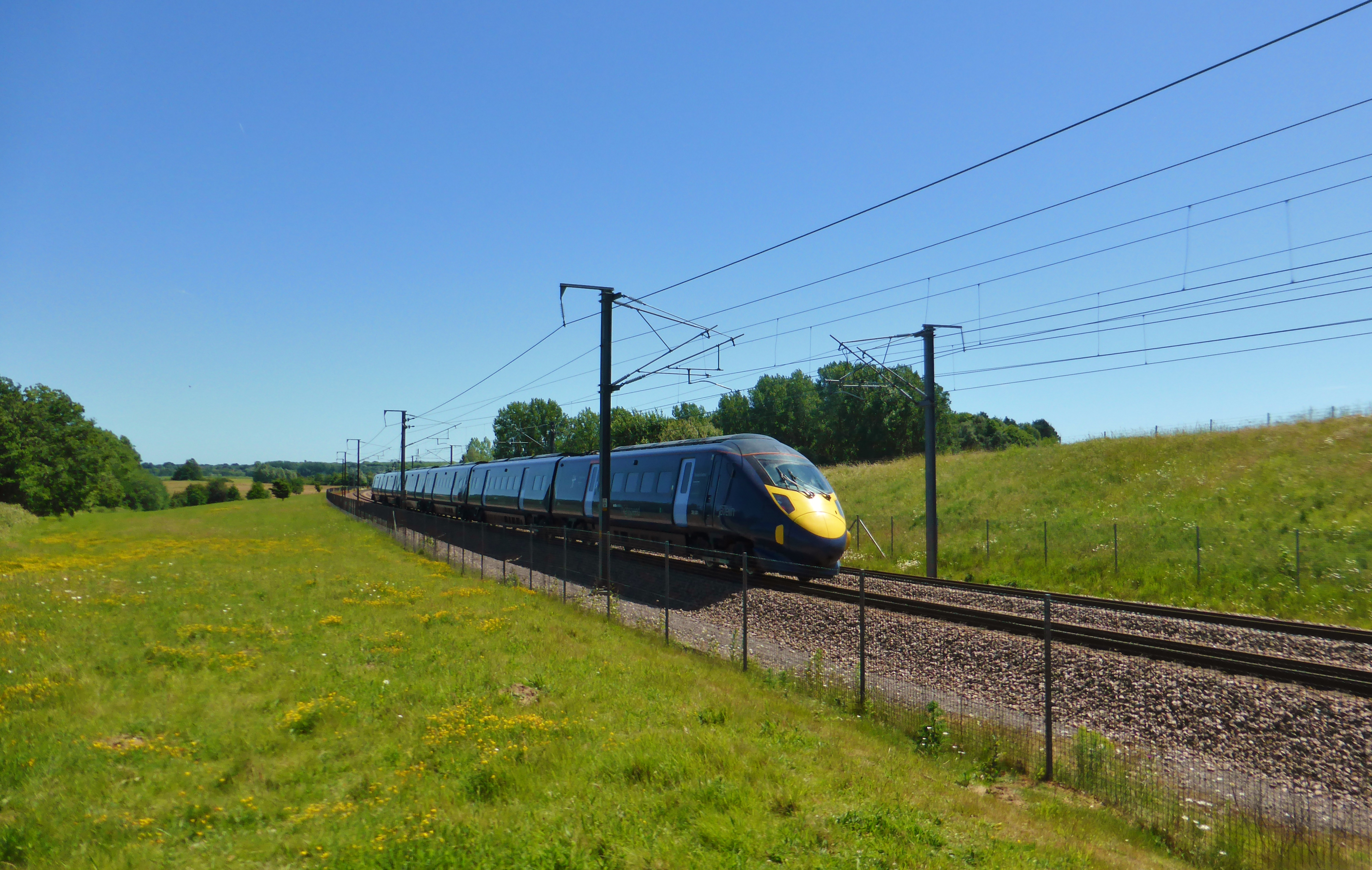
British Rail Class 395 high-speed train in Kent

In the 1963, the British Rail board voted to establish the British Rail Research Division, to explore new technologies for high-speed freight and passenger rail services on existing rail infrastructure, leading to the initiation of the Advanced Passenger Train (APT) programme, with a planned top speed of 155 mph (249 km/h). An experimental version, the APT-E, was tested between 1972 and 1976. It was equipped with a tilting mechanism which allowed the train to tilt into bends to reduce cornering forces on passengers, and was powered by gas turbines (the first to be used on British Rail since the Great Western Railway). The line had used Swiss-built Brown-Boveri and British-built Metropolitan-Vickers locomotives (18000 and 18100) in the early 1950s. The 1970s oil crisis prompted a rethink in the choice of motive power (as with the prototype TGV in France), and British Rail later opted for traditional electric overhead lines when the pre-production and production APTs were brought into service in 1980–86.

Initial experience with the Advanced Passenger Trains was positive. They had a high power-to-weight ratio to enable rapid acceleration; and the C-APT in cab signalling system, to permit operations in excess of 125 mph (201 km/h), the prototype set record speeds on the Great Western Main Line and the Midland Main Line, and the production versions vastly reduced journey times on the WCML. The APT was, however, beset with technical problems; financial constraints and negative media coverage eventually caused the project to be cancelled.

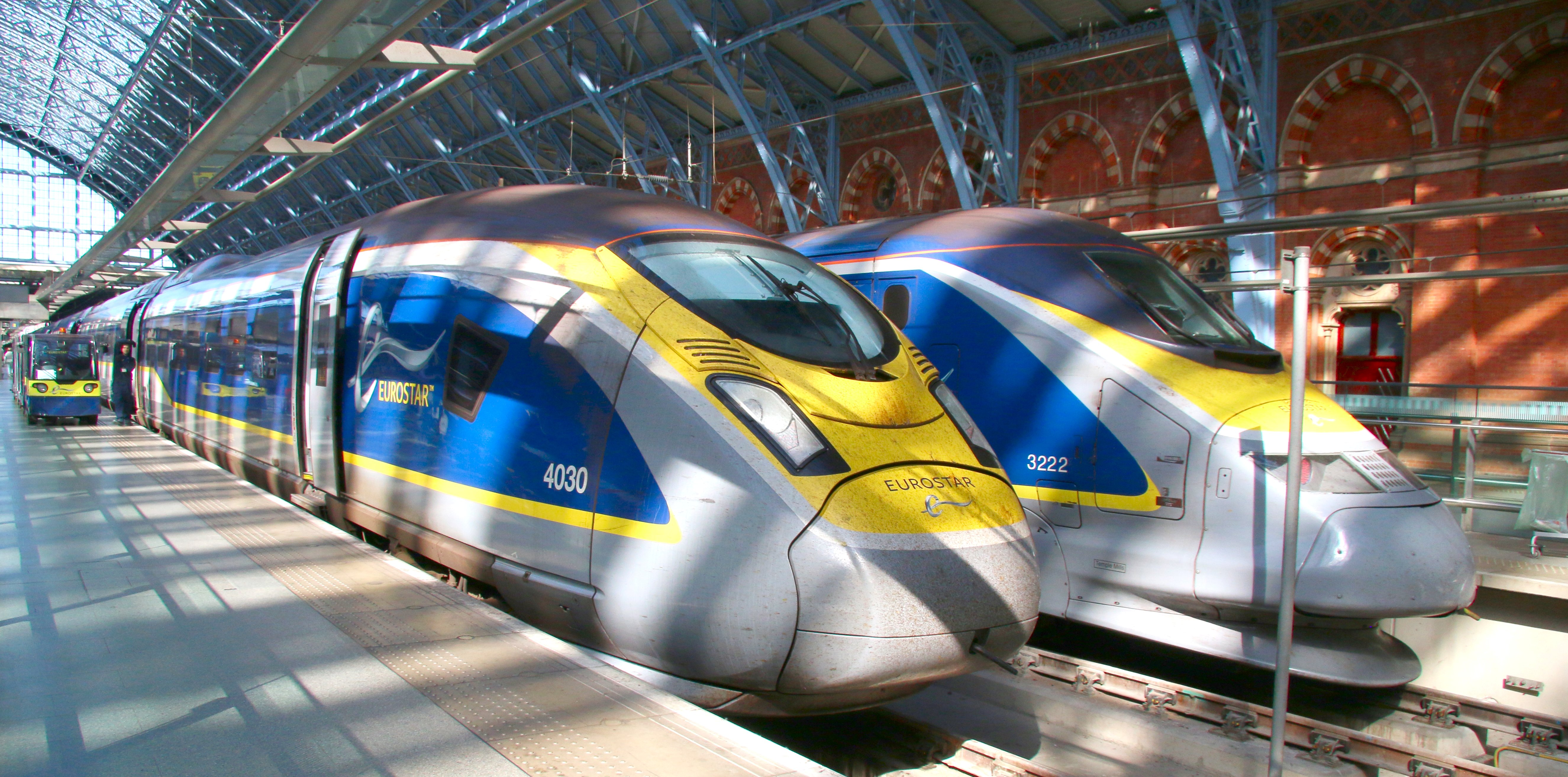
Eurostar high speed trains at St Pancras Station

==== Current network and projects ====
Trains currently travel at 125 mph (201 km/h) on five lines (across at least one section): the East Coast Main Line, Great Western Main Line, Midland Main Line, parts of the Cross Country Route, and the West Coast Main Line.

New dedicated high-speed lines have an operating speed of more than 250 km/h (155 mph):

- High Speed 1 (HS1) connects London to the Channel Tunnel, with international Eurostar services running from London St Pancras International to cities in France, Belgium, and the Netherlands at 186 mph (299 km/h). That line is also used by high-speed commuter services from Kent to the capital, operating at top speeds of 140 mph (225 km/h). It opened on 14 November 2007, on time and under budget.
- A second line, High Speed 2 (HS2), has been under construction since 2019 between London and Birmingham with later extensions to Manchester and Leeds cancelled in 2023 and 2021 respectively due to spiralling costs. It will link London with the Midlands at 224 mph (360 km/h) and reduce journey times to major cities in the North and Scotland. HS2 is a more sustainable high-speed line critical for the UK's low carbon transport future, building several new railway stations and bridges. Government-backed plans to provide east–west high-speed services between cities in the North of England announced in 2014 as part of the Northern Powerhouse Rail project are in development, and were expanded by Prime Minister Rishi Sunak in 2023 as part of Network North.

Like other European countries, the strongest reasons for new high-speed lines are to relieve congestion on the existing network and create extra capacity.

Line	Operating speed (max)	Length	Construction began	Construction completed or expected start of revenue services
High Speed 1	300 km/h (190 mph)	108 km (67 mi)	1998	2007
High Speed 2	Service: 330 km/h (205 mph); Maximum: 360 km/h (225 mph)	230 km (140 mi)	2017	2029 to 2033
East Coast Main Line	200 km/h (125 mph)	632.7 km (393.1 mi)	1840s	1850
Great Western Main Line	200 km/h (125 mph)	190 km (120 mi)	1830s	1841
Midland Main Line	200 km/h (125 mph)	500 km (310 mi)	1830s	1839
Cross Country Route (Birmingham - Derby)	200 km/h (125 mph)	56 km (35 mi)	1836	1839
West Coast Main Line	200 km/h (125 mph)	642 km (399 mi)	1830s	1837

In order to carry passengers to destinations beyond the core routes to Paris and Brussels, new Class 374 trains, also referred to as the Eurostar e320, were introduced in November 2015. A Class 374 train has 900 seats, roughly equivalent to six Airbus A320s or Boeing 737s (the aircraft typically used by low-cost airlines).

=== Spain ===
The Spanish high-speed rail network, the longest in Europe

Spain operates the largest high-speed rail network in Europe with 3,973 km (2,469 mi) and the second-largest in the world, trailing only China.

==== Early developments ====
In 1978, the Spanish manufacturer Talgo registered the world speed record for diesel-powered trains at 230 km/h (143 mph) with a Talgo 4. The same company had reached successive records at 135 km/h (84 mph) in 1942 with a Talgo 1, 200 km/h (124 mph) in 1964 with a Talgo 3, and then reached 500 km/h (311 mph) on a static test bench in 1990 with a Talgo 350 tilting train. Following these technical benchmarks, maximum commercial speeds in the Spanish networks were set at 120 km/h (75 mph) in 1950, 160 km/h (99 mph) in 1986, and 200 km/h (124 mph) in 1989.

==== The AVE service ====
The Alta Velocidad Española (AVE) high-speed rail service in Spain has been operating since 1992, when the Madrid–Seville route started running, at speeds up to 300 km/h (186 mph), and up to 310 km/h (193 mph) between 2011 and 2016 on a 60 km (37 mi) section of the Madrid–Zaragoza railway. More than ten other lines have been opened since 2005, including the 621-kilometre (386 mi) long Madrid–Barcelona line in 2008. By December 2021, the total length of the ADIF-maintained network was 3,762 km (2,338 mi), making it the longest in Europe, and the second longest in the world after mainland China's.

The ambitious AVE construction programme aims to connect with high-speed trains almost all provincial capitals to Madrid in less than 3 hours and to Barcelona within 6 hours. With an initial deadline set for 2020, the programme was slowed down by the 2008–2014 Spanish financial crisis: the two main lines still under construction, the Mediterranean Corridor and the Madrid–Extremadura line (which would be part of the Madrid-Lisbon link), are yet to be completed.

The Spanish and Portuguese high-speed lines are being built to European standard track gauge (UIC) of 1,435 mm (4 ft 8 1/2 in) and electrified with 25 kV at 50 Hz from overhead wire. The first HSL from Madrid to Seville is equipped with the LZB train control system, and later lines with ETCS.

Elsewhere in Europe, the success of high-speed services has been due in part to interoperability with existing normal rail lines. Interoperability between the new AVE lines and the older Iberian gauge network presents additional challenges. Both Talgo and CAF supply trains with variable gauge wheels operated by automatic gauge-changer equipment which the trains pass through without stopping (Alvias). Some lines are being constructed as dual gauge to allow trains with Iberian and UIC gauge to run on the same tracks. Other lines have been re-equipped with sleepers for both Iberian and UIC gauge, such that the track can be converted from Iberian to UIC gauge at a later time without changing the sleepers.

The first AVE trains to link up with the French standard gauge network began running in December 2013, when direct high-speed rail services between Spain and France were launched for the first time. This connection between the two countries was made possible by the construction of the Perpignan–Barcelona high-speed rail line (a follow-up of the Madrid-Barcelona line), completed in January 2013, and its international section Perpignan-Figueres, which opened in December 2010 and includes a new 8.3-kilometre (5.2 mi) tunnel under the Pyrenees. Another high-speed rail link connecting the two countries at Irun/Hendaye is also planned.

==== Current network and projects ====
The total length of lines is 3,973 km (2,469 mi) as of 2023, with long-term plans to expand it up to 7,000 km (4,350 mi). Several new high-speed lines are under construction with a design speed of 300–350 km/h (190–220 mph), and several old lines are being upgraded to allow passenger trains to operate at 250 km/h (155 mph).

Line	Operating speed (max)	Length	Construction began	Construction completed or expected start of revenue services
Madrid–Seville high-speed rail line	300 km/h (186 mph)	472 km (293 mi)	1989	1992
L.A.V. Madrid-Toledo	220 km/h (137 mph)	74 km (46 mi)	2003	2005
L.A.V. Córdoba–Málaga	300 km/h (186 mph)	155 km (96 mi)	2001	2007
L.A.V. Madrid–Valladolid	300 km/h (186 mph)	179.6 km (111.6 mi)	2001	2007
Madrid–Barcelona high-speed rail line	300 km/h (186 mph)	621 km (386 mi)	1995	2008
L.A.V. Madrid–Valencia	300 km/h (186 mph)	391 km (243 mi)	2004	2010
L.A.V. Albacete–Alicante	300 km/h (186 mph)	171.5 km (106.6 mi)	Unknown	2013
L.A.V. Barcelona – France–Spain border	300 km/h (186 mph)	150.8 km (93.7 mi)	2004	2013
Atlantic Axis high-speed rail line	200 km/h (124 mph)	155.6 km (96.7 mi)	2001	2015
L.A.V. Valladolid–León	300 km/h (186 mph)	162.7 km (101.1 mi)	2009	2015
L.A.V. Valencia–Castellón	200 km/h (124 mph)	74 km (46 mi)	Unknown	2018
L.A.V. Palencia–Burgos	300 km/h (186 mph)	134.8 km (83.8 mi)	2009	2022
L.A.V. Seville–Cádiz	200 km/h (124 mph)	157 km (98 mi)	2001	2015
L.A.V. Antequera–Granada	300 km/h (186 mph)	125.7 km (78.1 mi)	2006	2019
L.A.V. León–Pola de Lena	300 km/h (186 mph)	70.2 km (43.6 mi)	2009	2023
L.A.V. Olmedo–Zamora-Galicia	300 km/h (186 mph)	435 km (270 mi)	2004	2021
L.A.V. Murcia–Almería	300 km/h (186 mph)	184.3 km (114.5 mi)	Unknown	2026
L.A.V. Burgos-Vitoria-Gasteiz: Burgos–Vitoria-Gasteiz	300 km/h (186 mph)	98.8 km (61.4 mi)	2009	2025
Basque Y	250 km/h (155 mph)	175 km (109 mi)	2006	2028
Mediterranean High Speed Corridor: Andalusia–Murcia–Valencia–Catalonia–French border	250–300 km/h (155–186 mph)	+1,300 km (808 mi)	2004	2013–2025
Madrid–(Cáceres–Mérida–Badajoz)–Portuguese border	300 km/h (190 mph)	437 km (272 mi)	2008	2030
L.A.V. Madrid-Jaén: Madrid–Jaén	250–300 km/h (155–186 mph)	Unknown	2015	Unknown
L.A.V. Madrid–Santander (Palencia-Reinosa high-speed rail line)	Unknown	Unknown	Unknown	2025
Madrid Atocha–Madrid Chamartín	160 km/h (99 mph)	7 km (4.3 mi)	Unknown	2022

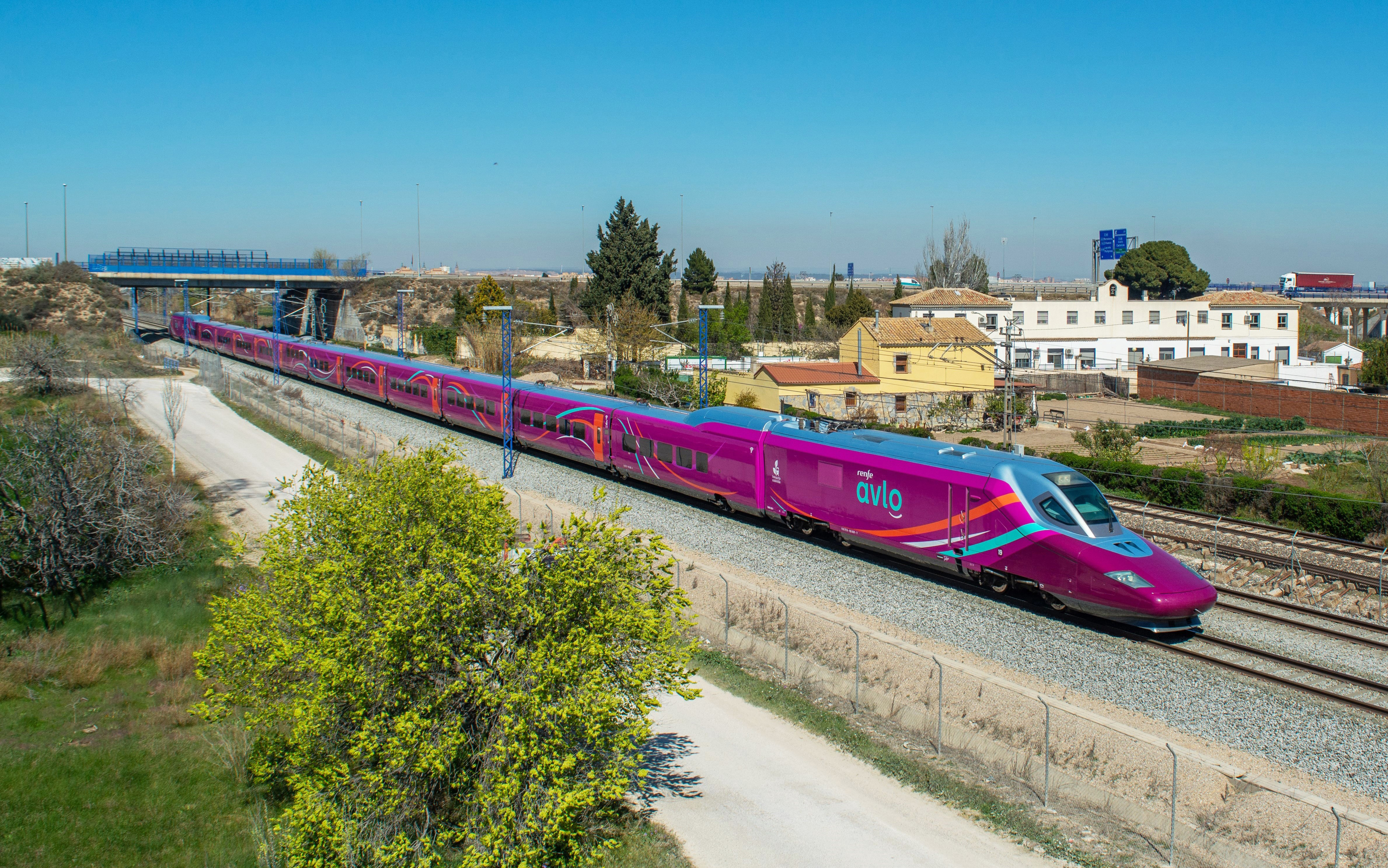
A Renfe Class 102 refurbished for Avlo services

Three companies have built or will build trains for the Spanish high-speed railway network: Spanish Talgo, French Alstom and German Siemens. Bombardier Transportation is a partner in both the Talgo-led and the Siemens-led consortium. France will eventually build 25 kV TGV lines all the way to the Spanish border (there is now a gap between Nîmes and Perpignan), but multi-voltage trains will still be needed, as trains travelling to Paris need to travel the last few kilometres on 1.5 kV lines. To this end, Renfe decided to convert 10 existing AVE S100 trains to operate at this voltage (as well as the French signalling systems), which will cost €30,000,000 instead of the previously expected €270,000,000 for new trains.

The network eventually opened to operators other than Renfe, and the SNCF-owned low-cost brand Ouigo España began to serve the Madrid–Barcelona route on 10 May 2021. To complement its higher-end AVE trains, Renfe launched a no-frills service called Avlo on 23 June 2021. Iryo, operated by the ILSA joint venture between Air Nostrum and Trenitalia, began operation in late 2022, making Spain the first country in Europe with three competing operators of high-speed trains.

== Integration of European high-speed rail network ==
The Trans-European high-speed rail network is one of a number of the European Union's Trans-European transport networks. It was defined by the Council Directive 96/48/EC of 23 July 1996.

The aim of this EU Directive is to achieve the interoperability of the European high-speed train network at the various stages of its design, construction and operation.

The network is defined as a system consisting of a set of infrastructures, fixed installations, logistic equipment and rolling stock.

On 5 June 2010, the European Commissioner for Transport signed a Memorandum of Understanding with France and Spain concerning a new high-speed rail line across the Pyrenees to become the first link between the high-speed lines of the two countries. Furthermore, high-speed lines between Helsinki and Berlin (Rail Baltica), and between Lyon and Budapest, were promoted.

=== Cross-border infrastructure and passenger services ===
==== Belgium ====
High-speed rail network in Belgium

Belgium's rail network is served by three high-speed train operators: Eurostar, ICE and TGV trains. All of them serve Brussels South station, Belgium's largest railway station. Thalys trains, which are a variant of the French TGV, operate between Belgium, Germany (Dortmund), the Netherlands (Amsterdam) and France (Paris). Since 2007, Eurostar has connected Brussels to London St Pancras, before which, trains connected to London Waterloo. The German ICE operates between Brussels, Liège and Frankfurt.

The HSL 1 is a Belgian high-speed railway line which connects Brussels with the French border. 88 km (55 mi) long (71 km (44 mi) dedicated high-speed tracks, 17 km (11 mi) modernised lines), it began service on 14 December 1997. The line has appreciably shortened rail journeys, the journey from Paris to Brussels now taking 1:22. In combination with the LGV Nord, it has also affected international journeys to France and London, ensuring high-speed through-running by Eurostar, TGV, Thalys PBA and Thalys PBKA trainsets. The total construction cost was €1.42 billion.

The HSL 2 is a Belgian high-speed rail line between Brussels and Liège, 95 km (59 mi) long (61 km (38 mi) dedicated high-speed tracks between Leuven and Ans, 34 km (21 mi) modernised lines between Brussels and Leuven and between Ans and Liège) it began service on 15 December 2002. Its extension to the German border (the HSL 3) is now in use, the combined high-speed line greatly accelerates journeys between Brussels, Paris and Germany. HSL 2 is used by Thalys and ICE trains as well as fast internal InterCity services.

The HSL 3 is a Belgian high-speed railway line which connects Liège to the German border. 56 km (35 mi) long (42 km (26 mi) dedicated high-speed tracks, 14 km (8.7 mi) modernised lines), it began service on 13 December 2009. HSL 3 is used by international Thalys and ICE trains only, as opposed to HSL 2 which is also used for fast internal InterCity services.

The HSL 4 is a Belgian high-speed railway line which connects Brussels to the Dutch border. 87 km (54 mi) long (40 km (25 mi) dedicated high-speed tracks, 47 km (29 mi) modernised lines). HSL 4 is used by Thalys trains since 13 December 2009 and it will be used starting 2010 by fast internal InterCity trains. Between Brussels and Antwerp (47 km (29 mi)), trains travel at 160 km/h (99 mph) on the upgraded existing line (with the exception of a few segments where a speed limit of 120 km/h (75 mph) is imposed). At the E19/A12 motorway junction, trains leave the regular line to run on new dedicated high-speed tracks to the Dutch border (40 km (25 mi)) at 300 km/h (186 mph).

The completion of the Channel Tunnel rail link (High Speed 1) and the completion of the lines from Brussels to Amsterdam and Cologne led to news reports in November 2007 that both Eurostar and Deutsche Bahn were pursuing direct services from London to Amsterdam and Cologne. Both journeys would be under 4 hours, the length generally considered competitive with air travel.

The 25N line (Schaerbeek–Mechelen) opened in 2012–2018 is designed for speeds up to 220 km/h (137 mph), but is limited to 160 km/h (99 mph) until another existing line Mechelen-Antwerp will be upgraded. It's unknown when it will happen.

==== Netherlands ====
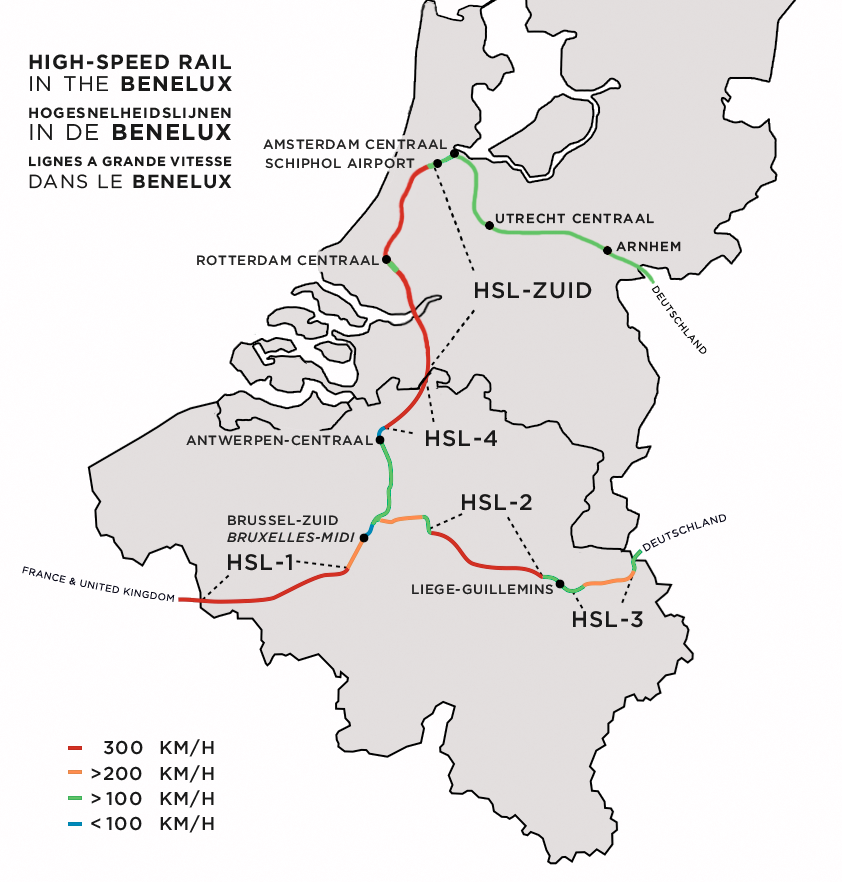
HSL-Zuid, connected to Antwerp with the HSL 4

HSL-Zuid (Dutch: Hogesnelheidslijn Zuid, English: High-Speed Line South) is a 125 km (78 mi) high-speed line in the Netherlands. Using existing tracks from Amsterdam Centraal to Schiphol Airport, the dedicated high-speed line begins here and continues to Rotterdam Centraal and to the Belgian border. Here, it connects to the HSL 4, terminating at Antwerpen-Centraal. Den Haag Centraal (The Hague) and Breda are connected to the high-speed line by conventional railway lines. Services on the HSL-Zuid began on 7 September 2009. It is being served by Thalys trains from Amsterdam to Brussels and Paris, Eurostar trains to Brussels and London, Eurocity and Eurocity Direct services from Amsterdam to Brussels also Eurocity services only go up to Rotterdam and domestic Intercity Direct Services.

HSL-Oost was planned, but was put on hiatus. It would connect Amsterdam Centraal via Utrecht Centraal and Arnhem to Germany. The existing line from Amsterdam to Utrecht is four-tracked. Two tracks out of four are capable of 200 km/h (124 mph), but the available voltage is not high enough. The line is planned to be re-electrified to 25 kV AC.

In the north, a new line called Lelylijn is under study between Lelystad and Groningen, with operating speed up to 200 km/h (124 mph). This line would, along with other measures on the Amsterdam - Copenhagen corridor, allow to reduce the traveling time between these two cities down to 4h 30mn.

==== Paris to Frankfurt ====
Admission of ICE trains onto French LGVs was applied for in 2001, and trial runs were completed in 2005. In June 2007, the LGV Est from Paris to the middle of the Lorraine region of France was opened. For the first time, high-speed services over the Franco-German border were offered. SNCF operates the TGV service between Paris and Stuttgart via Strasbourg and a daily return journey from Paris to Frankfurt via Saarbrücken, while ICE trains operate the remaining Paris to Frankfurt.

==== Frankfurt to Marseille ====
After the inauguration of the LGV Rhin-Rhône in 2011 a daily high-speed TGV service has been introduced between Frankfurt Hbf and Marseille St. Charles via Strasbourg, Mulhouse, Lyon and Valence with a total travel time under 8h.

==== Channel Tunnel ====
The construction of the Channel Tunnel, completed in 1994, provided the impetus for the first cross-border high-speed rail line. In 1993, the LGV Nord, which connects Paris to the Belgian border and the Channel Tunnel via Lille, was opened. Initial travel times through the tunnel from London to Paris and Brussels were about 3 hours. In 1997, a dedicated high-speed line to Brussels, HSL 1, was opened. In 2007, High Speed 1, the Channel Tunnel Rail Link to London, was completed after a partial opening in 2003. All three lines were built to the French LGV standards, including electrification at 25 kV. The Channel tunnel itself is geometrically achievable to provide 200 km/h (124 mph) speed, but it is limited to 160 km/h (99 mph). In the 1990s it was claimed that such speed restriction is temporary.

===== London to Paris and Brussels =====
Passenger trains built to specific safety standards are operated by Eurostar through the Channel Tunnel. Direct trains now travel from London St Pancras to Paris in 2h15, and to Brussels in 1h51. On 1 May 2015 Eurostar introduced a weekly service from London to Lyon, Avignon and Marseille. Thalys high-speed international trains serve the Paris to Brussels corridor, which is now covered in 1h20. Additional Thalys services extend to Amsterdam and Cologne in addition to Belgian cities.

===== London to Amsterdam and Germany =====
Both Deutsche Bahn (DB) and Eurostar have announced plans for direct services from London to new continental destinations in the Netherlands and Germany. DB have not set a date for any new service to begin, although the company did at one point hope to introduce a five-hour service to Frankfurt by 2017. A four times daily direct Eurostar service between London St Pancras and Amsterdam started running on 4 April 2018. The German manufacturer Siemens has designed trainsets to meet the strict safety standards of Channel Tunnel operation.

==== Spanish-French border ====
A 131-kilometre (81.4 mi) section of the Perpignan–Barcelona high-speed rail line across the Spanish-French border opened in January 2013. The line includes the new 8.3-kilometre (5.2 mi) Perthus Tunnel under the Pyrenees and permits high-speed rail services between Spain and France. Since 15 December 2013 the French SNCF operates a TGV service between Paris and Barcelona and the Spanish AVE offers direct Madrid–Marseille, Barcelona–Lyon and Barcelona–Toulouse high-speed services. The journey time for the TGV Paris–Barcelona service is now 6h 25min. A 60 kilometer Nîmes–Montpellier bypass is under construction and will chop 20 minutes off travel times from Barcelona to Lyon and beyond. There is on the other hand currently no funding for the missing segment of high-speed line between Montpellier and Perpignan, which would cut journey times between the two countries by an additional hour.

Another high-speed rail link connecting the two countries is planned via Irun/Hendaye, but is not currently funded.

==== Crossing the Alps ====
The north–south axis has been improved by the Swiss NRLA project already in 2007 with the Lötschberg Base Tunnel and in 2016 with the currently world's longest railway tunnel, the Gotthard Base Tunnel.

Further international links between Italy and France, Switzerland, Austria and Slovenia are under way. These links all incorporate extensive new tunnelling under the Alps. European Union funding has already been approved for the Turin–Lyon high-speed railway, which will connect the TGV and TAV networks, and for a link with Slovenia. In Slovenia, Pendolino-based trainsets are operated by Slovenian Railways as the InterCitySlovenija. Trains connect the capital Ljubljana with Maribor and also with Koper in the summer months. One unit operated as EC Casanova on the line Ljubljana–Venice, but this service was discontinued in April 2008.

Between Austria and Italy, the Brenner Base Tunnel is being constructed to upgrade the Berlin–Palermo railway axis.

===== Paris to Berlin =====
A new service linking Paris and Berlin launched on December 16, 2024. It runs between Paris Gare de L’Est and Berlin Hauptbahnhof, stopping in Strasbourg, Karlsruhe, and Frankfurt Süd, and takes about eight hours for the 1240-kilometre (770 mi) journey, averaging 155 km/h (96 mi/h). The operators of the route are SNCF and Deutsche Bahn. In 2026, a second daily service was being considered, with the original service averaging 80% occupancy, with 75% of passengers making the entire journey.

== Future projects adjacent to existing high-speed services ==
=== Magistrale for Europe ===
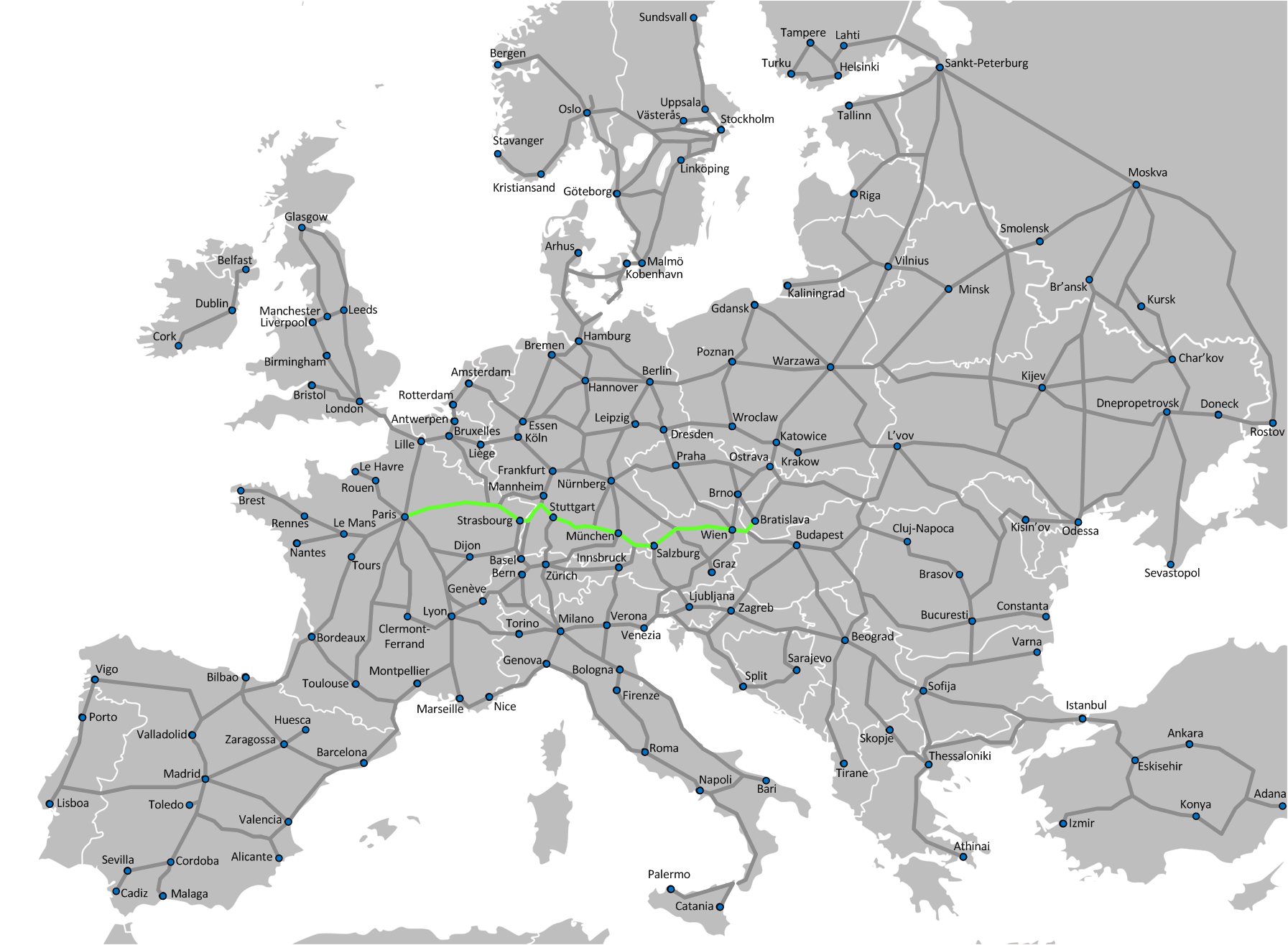
Planned high-speed rail link Paris – Bratislava

The Magistrale for Europe (MoE) is an initiative to promote railway expansion between Paris and Bratislava/Budapest, passing Strasbourg and Munich. Founded in 1990, the initiative is supported by numerous cities and regions along the line. Several railway projects, such as the LGV Est and Rastatt tunnel, have been promoted through the initiative.

=== Austria ===
The Western Railway between the capital Vienna and Salzburg is being upgraded. Most new sections have a continuous maximum design speed of 250 km/h (155 mph). German and Austrian ICE trains operate at a maximum speed of 230 km/h (143 mph), as do Austrian locomotive-hauled trains (called railjet) which were launched in 2008.

The 55 km (34 mi) Brenner Base Tunnel under construction will allow speeds of up to 250 km/h (155 mph). The first part of the New Lower Inn Valley railway was opened in December 2012 as part of an upgrade of the line connecting the future Brenner Base Tunnel and southern Germany, which is being upgraded from two tracks to four and to a maximum design speed of 250 km/h (155 mph). The section is also part of the Berlin–Palermo railway axis.

The Koralm Railway, the first entirely new railway line in the Second Austrian Republic has been under construction between 2006 and 2025. It includes a new 33 km (21 mi) tunnel (the Koralm Tunnel) connecting the cities of Klagenfurt and Graz. Primarily built for intermodal freight transport, it is also used by passenger trains travelling at up to 250 km/h (155 mph). The time taken to travel from Klagenfurt to Graz has been reduced from three hours (by train) and two hours (by bus) to 41 minutes. The Koralmbahn was opened on December 14, 2025.

Line	Maximum speed	Length	Construction began	Service started
Western Railway (Vienna - Attnang-Puchheim)	200/230 km/h (per sections)	243 km (151 mi)	Unknown (past)	1990 (Linz - Wels) to 2016 (Ybbs - Amstetten)
New Lower Inn Valley railway (Kundl - Baumkirchen)	220 km/h	40.236 km (25.001 mi)	Unknown (past)	9 December 2012
Marchegger Eastern railway (upgrade Vienna Stadlau - Slovak border)	200 km/h	38 km	Unknown (past)	2025 (expected)
Pottendorfer line (upgrade & new Vienna Inzersdorf Ort - Wr. Neustadt)	200 km/h	47 km	Unknown (past)	2024 (expected)
Koralm Railway (Graz - Klagenfurt)	250 km/h	127 km (79 mi)	2001	2025
Semmering Base Tunnel (Gloggnitz - Mürzzuschlag)	230 km/h	27.3 km (17.0 mi)	2012	2030 (expected)
Brenner Base Tunnel & its Austrian access (Volders-Baumkirchen - Italian border)	250 km/h	46 km	Summer 2006	2032 (expected)
North Railway (upgrade Gänserndorf - Břeclav, Czech Republic)	200 km/h	47 km	2024 (expected)	2030 (expected)
Western Railway (new line Köstendorf - Salzburg)	250 km/h	21.3 km (13.2 mi)	2025/2026 (expected)	2040 (expected)
New Lower Inn Valley railway (Kundl - Brannenburg, Germany)	230 km/h	25 km (16 mi)	Unknown (future)	Unknown (future)

=== Czech Republic ===
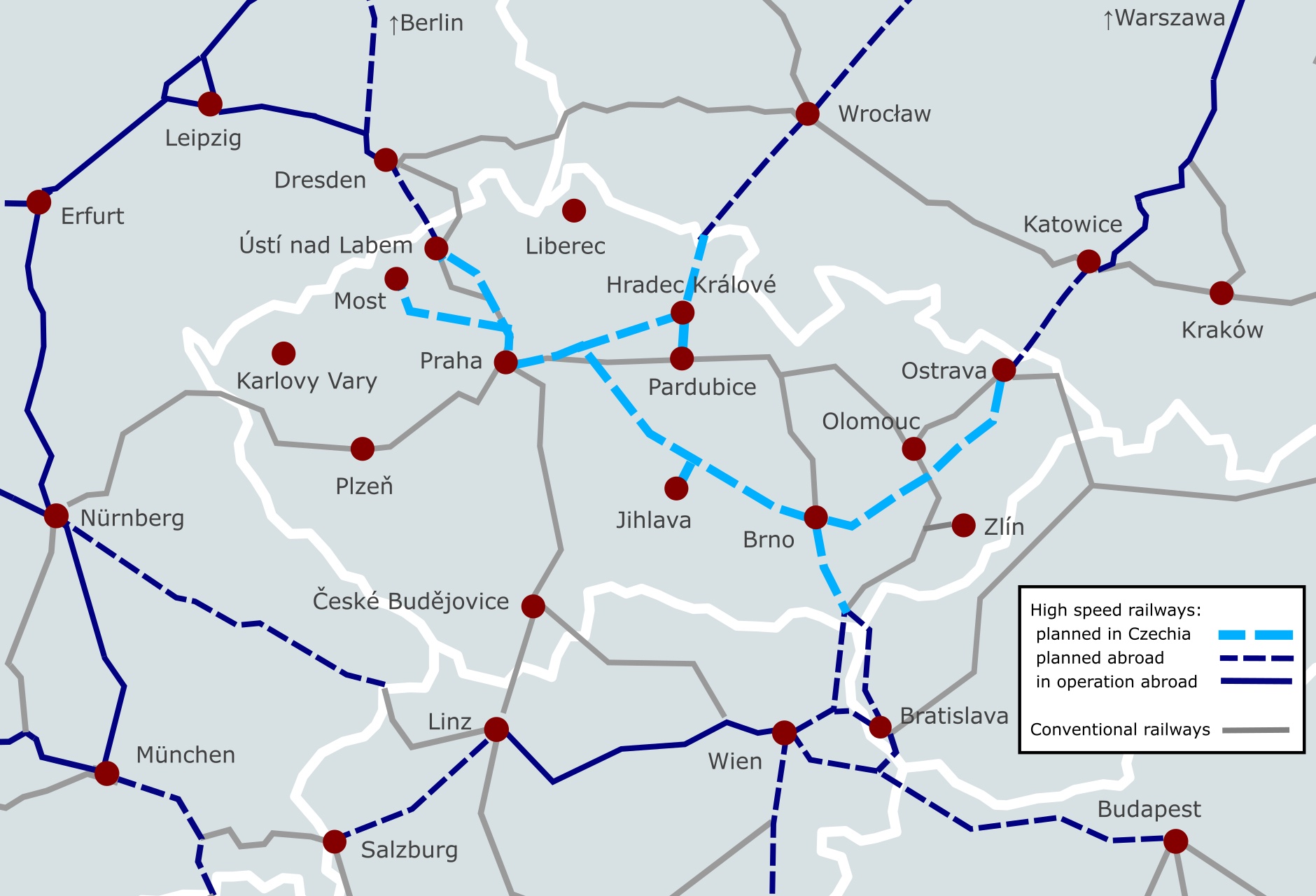
Map of planned high-speed railroads in Czechia

There is currently a single high-speed rail line in operation in Czechia with parts of the upgraded Prague - České Budějovice line operating at 200 km/h since early 2025 using the Super City Pendolino tilting trains.

In 2004, the Czech Ministry of Transportation presented its plan for a high-speed rail network which should be roughly 660 km (410 mi) long. In 2017 the government approved five new-built main lines connecting the largest cities (main line being the RS1 Prague-Brno-Ostrava) and neighbouring countries. The operation speed should reach more than 300 km/h (186 mph) on most sections of the network. Different parts of the expected network are at different stages of planning as of 2026.

The most challenging part of high-speed rail will be linking Prague and Dresden in Saxony via Ústí nad Labem which will require a new 25 km long tunnel through the Ore Mountains. It should have speed of 200 km/h for personal transport and 110 km/h for freight transport. The tunnel is of a strategic importance for Czechia as in 2023 the only electrified line linking Germany and the Czech Republic goes through the narrow Elbe valley, which is limiting capacity. The connection between Prague, Dresden and Berlin lies on the European Orient/East-Med Corridor, an important freight link to the North Sea ports. The rail connection was added to the German Bundesverkehrswegeplan 2015 (federal transportation plan) which lays out German transportation priorities until 2030, but it does not include the line in its highest priority category, making construction unlikely in the near term.

In regard to the rolling stock, the Czech Railways have been running the Super City Pendolino from Prague to Ostrava since 2005. The Pendolino is capable of operating at 230 km/h (143 mph) with trains limited to 200 km/h (124 mph) since early 2025, reaching this speed only on the Prague to České Budějovice upgraded line. For example, the last parts of 4th transit corridor (Prague–České Budějovice) The railjet rolling stock is also capable of 230 km/h (143 mph) and reaches that speed in Austria and Germany but is limited to 185 km/h (115 mph) in the Czech Republic.

The Velim railway test circuit contains a large 13.3-kilometre (8.3 mi) track with a maximum allowed speed of 230 km/h (143 mph) for tilting trains and up to 210 km/h (130 mph) for conventional trains.

=== Switzerland ===
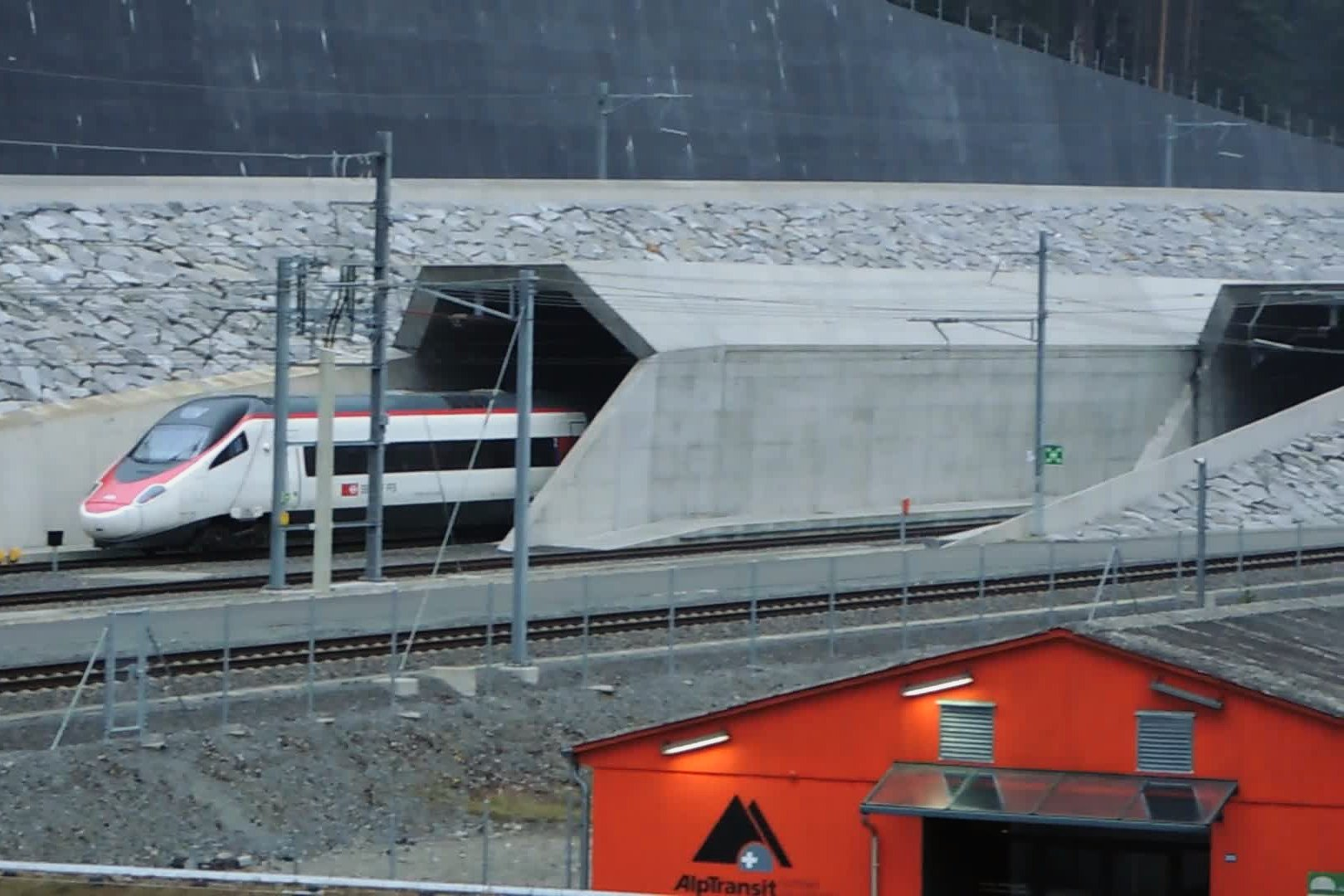
SBB EuroCity entering the Gotthard Base Tunnel

The French-Swiss co-operation TGV Lyria and German ICE lines extend into Switzerland, but given the dense rail traffic and the often difficult terrain, they do not attain speeds higher than 200 km/h (124 mph) (ICE3) or 160 km/h (99 mph) (TGV, ICE1, ICE2). The fastest Swiss train is the SBB RABe 501 also named Giruno. It is operated by the Swiss Federal Railways since May 2016. They can reach higher speeds than conventional trains on the curve-intensive Swiss network; however, the top speed of 200 km/h (124 mph) can only be reached on high-speed lines. The former Cisalpino consortium owned by the Swiss Federal Railways and Trenitalia used Pendolino tilting trains on two of its international lines. These trains are now operated by the Swiss Federal Railways and Trenitalia.

To address transalpine freight and passenger bottlenecks on its roads and railways, Switzerland launched the Rail2000 and NRLA projects.

Line	Max speed	Operating speed (max)	Length	Construction began	Construction completed or start of revenue services
Mattstetten–Rothrist new line	200 km/h (125 mph)	200 km/h (125 mph)	45 km	1996	2004
Solothurn-Wanzwil new line	Per section: 200 km/h (125 mph); or 140 km/h (87 mph)	Per section: 200 km/h (125 mph); or 140 km/h (87 mph)	12 km	?	2004
Lötschberg Base Tunnel	250 km/h (155 mph)	200 km/h (125 mph)	35 km	1994	2007
Gotthard Base Tunnel	Technical: 250 km/h (155 mph); Authorized: 230 km/h (145 mph)	Normal: 200 km/h (125 mph); If delay: 230 km/h (145 mph)	57 km	1999	2016
Ceneri Base Tunnel	Technical: 250 km/h (155 mph); Authorized: 230 km/h (145 mph)	Normal: 200 km/h (125 mph); If delay: 230 km/h (145 mph)	15 km	2006	2020

== Nordic countries ==
=== Denmark ===
Current completed and approved high-speed lines set to be built or upgraded in Denmark

Denmark is currently building two high-speed corridors: an international corridor linking Sweden to Germany through Copenhagen South, and a national corridor aiming to reduce travel times between the five biggest cities to less than one hour.

Denmark's two biggest cities, Copenhagen and Aarhus, are about 300 km (186 mi) apart. There is a political target to reach a two-hour traveling time between them, and 200 km/h (124 mph) is set as a target speed. Some parts are planned to be rerouted because the present railway is too curvy. These new sections are to designed for at least 250 km/h (155 mph).

The top speed of some small sections of the main lines is 180 km/h (112 mph), but trains quickly pass through these and return to slower sections around 140–160 km/h (87–99 mph). Most parts of the rail network are unelectrified – thus slowing acceleration and top speed. Since 2007 it has been common practice for the infrastructure provider Banedanmark to pad the timetables with extra time to a near European record, so that trains only use the top speeds to make up for lost time. Some of the rolling stock running on the Danish rail network is capable of reaching 200 km/h (124 mph), the SJ 2000 and the IC4 (the IC4 is only allowed up to 180 km/h or 112 mph in regular operation).

Denmark's signalling system, which contains numerous obsolete components, is being replaced with ERTMS 2, to be finished in 2034. This is a requirement for speeds higher than 180 km/h (112 mph).

The railway line from Ringsted towards the future Fehmarn Belt Fixed Link was upgraded to a 200 km/h (124 mph) double-tracked line in 2021. Once the fixed link project is completed, Denmark will be able to link the Swedish high-speed lines with the rest of the European high-speed rail network. As Germany is electrifying and upgrading the Lübeck–Puttgarden railway from the current limit of between 100 and 160 km/h (62 and 99 mph) to 200 km/h (124 mph), the only non-highspeed section will be Lübeck–Hamburg.

In 2013 the Danish Government (consisting of the parties: the Social Democrats, the Danish Social Liberal Party and the Socialist People's Party) along with the supporting party Red–Green Alliance and the opposition party Danish People's Party entered an ambitious political agreement on the infrastructure project called "The Train Fund DK". The main component of the agreement is to raise taxes on the oil companies operating in the Danish parts of the North Sea in order to raise 2,8 billion pounds earmarked for railway upgrades. The first priority is to reduce the travel time between Denmark's two biggest cities, Copenhagen and Aarhus to two hours. This includes upgrading all main lines to handle speeds up to 200 km/h (124 mph) and building three new high-speed lines with speeds up to 250 km/h (155 mph), which later can be upgraded to 300 km/h (186 mph). Furthermore, all main lines and many regional lines will be electrified.

Line	Operating speed	Length	Construction began	Start of revenue services
Øresund fixed link	200 km/h (124 mph)	7 km (4.3 mi)	1995	2000
Copenhagen–Ringsted Line	250 km/h (155 mph) (currently 180 km/h (112 mph))	60 km (37 mi)	2011	June 2019 at 180 km/h (112 mph); upgrade to 250 km/h (155 mph) expected in 2023
Ringsted–Fehmarn (part of Vogelfluglinie)	200 km/h (124 mph)	115 km (71 mi)	2013	Expected 2029

=== Finland ===
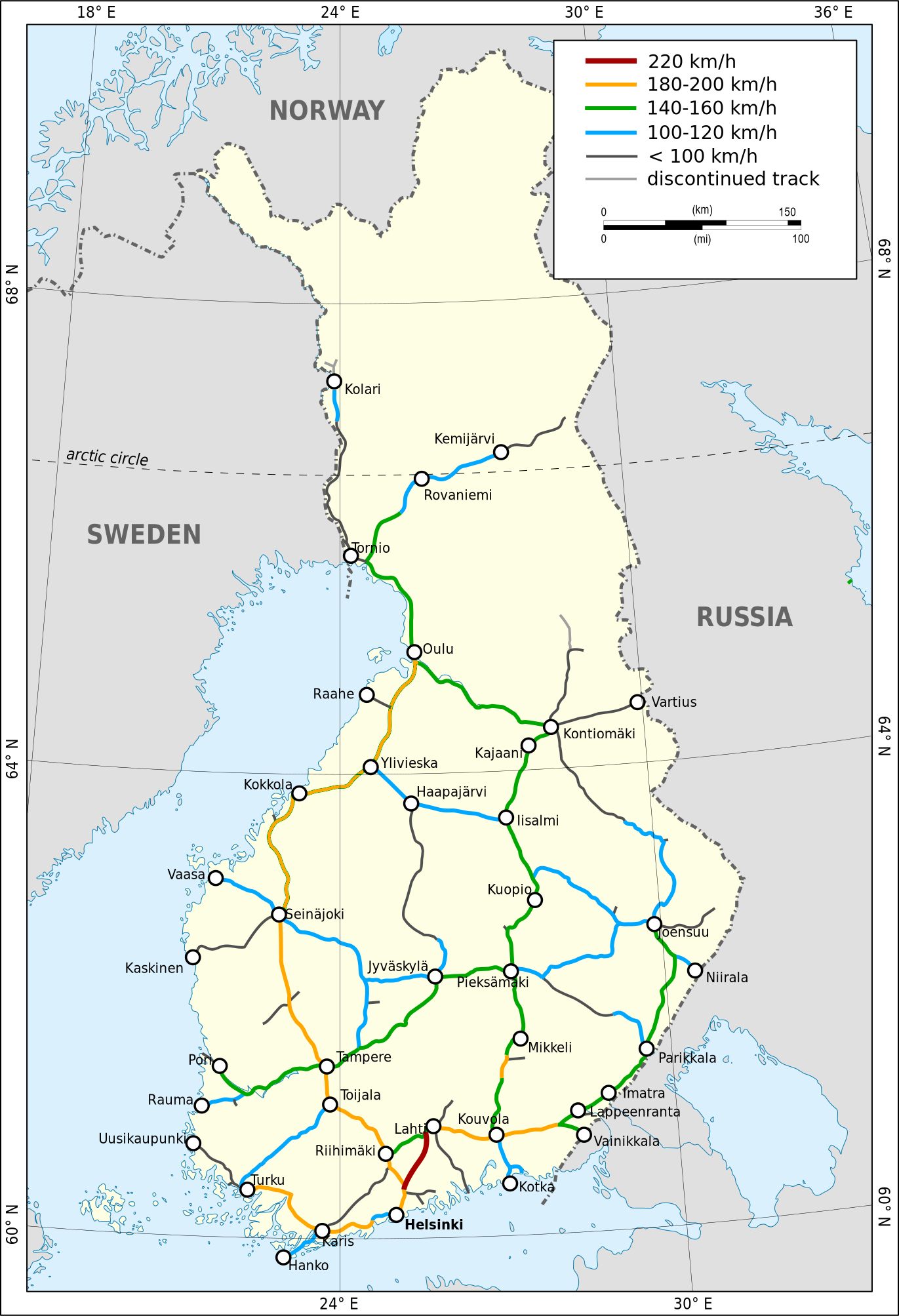
Running speeds on the Finnish railway network

In Finland the national railway company VR operates tilting Alstom Pendolino trains. The trains reach their maximum speed of 220 km/h (137 mph) in regular operation on a 60-kilometre (37 mi) route between Kerava and Lahti. This portion of track was opened in 2006. The trains can run at 200 km/h (124 mph) on a longer route between Helsinki and Seinäjoki and peak at that speed between Helsinki and Turku. The main railway line between Helsinki and Oulu is being upgraded between Seinäjoki and Oulu to allow for trains to run at speeds between 160 and 200 km/h (99 and 124 mph). Other parts of the Finnish railway network are limited to lower speed.

Between 2007 and 2010 the Russian line from the Finnish border to Saint Petersburg was electrified and improved to allow higher running speeds. The Finnish line was also upgraded where needed, mostly to 200 km/h (124 mph). In 2010, a new service called Allegro started between Helsinki and Saint Petersburg, using the improved network. The service has a journey time of 3½ hours. It utilizes a new Pendolino model, supporting both Finnish and Russian standards. Four new trains have been delivered, with a top speed of 220 km/h (137 mph). As of 2022, the service is on hold, a consequence of the 2022 Russian invasion of Ukraine.

The planned Helsinki–Turku high-speed railway featuring new track from Espoo to Salo would be capable of maximum speeds of 300 km/h (186 mph), making this the fastest railway in Finland once built. However the current plan only consist trains running at maximum speed of 200 km/h.

Line	Speed	Length	Construction began	Start of revenue services
Helsinki–Turku high-speed railway	300 km/h (186 mph)	95 km (59 mi)	Planned	2031

=== Iceland ===
A 49 km (30 mi) long railway, the first in Iceland, has been proposed to link Keflavík International Airport to the capital city of Reykjavík in order to relieve one of the country's busiest roads (route 41). The railway would accommodate high-speed trains of up to 250 km/h (155 mph), with an average speed of 180 km/h (112 mph), which would enable the distance to be travelled within just 18 minutes. As of 2024, the project had not advanced beyond the proposal stage.

Proposal for a Keflavík–Reykjavík line
Line	Speed	Length	Construction began	Start of revenue services
Reykjavik—Airport Rail Link	250 km/h (155 mph)	49 km (30 mi)	Proposed	Unknown

=== Norway ===
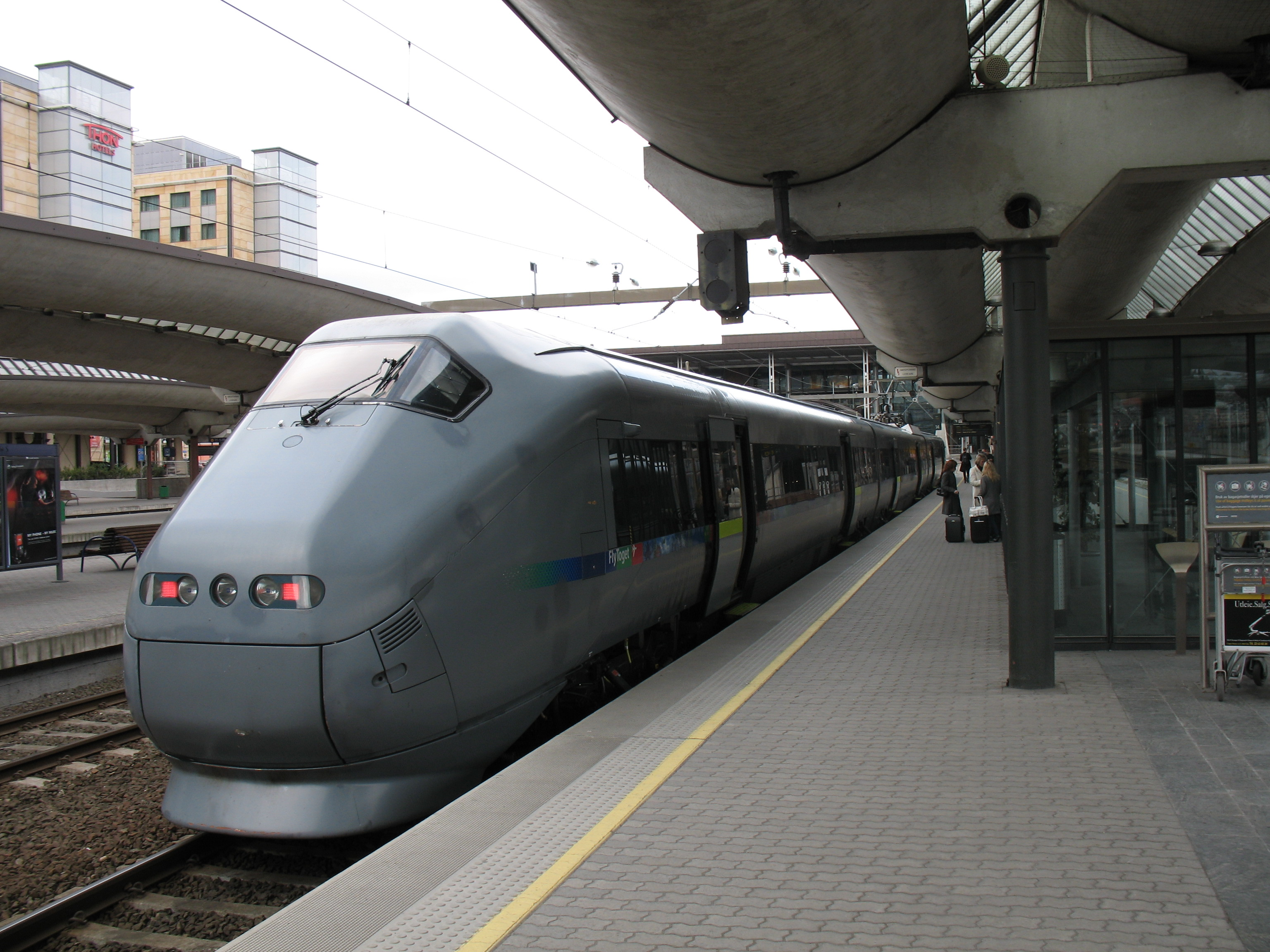
The Flytoget at Oslo station, Norway

Norway has several high speed stretches radiating from Oslo. These have speeds ranging from 200 to 250 km/h (124 to 155 mph). Several new railroad stretches are under construction and the complete Intercity triangle from Oslo will be finished by 2030.

Norway's only high-speed line is the 64 km (40 mi) Gardermobanen (The Gardermoen Railway), which links Oslo Airport (OSL) with the metropolitan areas of Oslo. Here the Flytoget (the Airport Express Train) and some of the NSB (Norwegian State Railways) trains operate at speeds of up to 210 km/h (130 mph). Gardermobanen contributes to give rail transport a relatively high market share. Almost 38% of the OSL passengers come by train, about 21% by bus, and about 40% by car.

Some more new high-speed lines are planned to be built in the Oslo region, during the 2010 and 2020 decades. Today, however, only small parts of Norway's rail network permit speeds faster than 130 km/h (81 mph).

There is a political climate for building more high-speed railway services in Norway, including long-distance lines from Oslo to Trondheim, Bergen, Stavanger and Gothenburg. They are assumed to be dedicated single-track high-speed railways having up to 250 km/h (155 mph). This is still at the feasibility planning stages.

The Norwegian government is examining five lines radiating out from Oslo to Bergen, Kristiansand/Stavanger, Trondheim, Gothenburg, and Stockholm. A sixth line would be a coastal line between Bergen, Haugesund and Stavanger. At least two investigations on cost and benefit have been made. A more indepth analysis covering route analysis of the 6 lines will be made on order by the Norwegian government beginning late 2010.

The closest 50–100 km (31–62 mi) from Oslo on each of these lines have good potential for regional trains (except towards Stockholm). Upgrade and new construction to high-speed standard have to some extent already taken place like for Gardermobanen. More is being built and is planned, but with the present ambition it will take decades to have high-speed standard the closest 100 km (62 mi) from Oslo on all these lines. The ambition is to some day have 200 km/h (124 mph) or more to Halden, Skien, Hønefoss and Hamar. These projects have higher priority than the long-distance projects. They are also preconditions for the long-distance projects, since they will be used by long-distance trains.

Line	Presently permitted Speed	Planned speed	Length	Construction began	Start of revenue services
Tønsberg–Drammen	200 km/h (124 mph)	250 km/h (155 mph)	57 km (35.4 mi)	1993	2001–≈2025
Larvik–Porsgrunn	200 km/h (124 mph)	250 km/h (155 mph)	23 km (14.3 mi)	?	2018
Oslo–Hamar	210 km/h (130 mph)	250 km/h (155 mph)	120 km (74.6 mi)	1994	1997–≈2027
Oslo–Ski	200 km/h (124 mph)	250 km/h (155 mph)	22 km (14 mi)	2020	11 December 2022

There are (as of 2024) no trains operating in Norway capable of over 210 km/h, and the signalling system does not allow more. Some of the lines are built for easy upgrade to 250 km/h when signalling system and other technical demands are fulfilled. New trains are needed to achieve this speed.

=== Sweden ===
A map of railways in Sweden. High-speed lines are in red and orange.

Newly built lines such as the West Coast Line, the Svealand Line and the Bothnia Line of the network can be relatively easily upgraded to 250 km/h (155 mph). This requires new signaling system, new trains and perhaps other minor efforts. The old main lines are difficult to upgrade due costs for increasing the bearing of the track. Most bridges and long sections of the main lines need to be rebuilt to allow 250 km/h (155 mph).

There are investigations regarding high-speed trains in Sweden, and to evaluate if the Western and Southern Mainline should be upgraded to 250 km/h (155 mph) or if a whole new network of high-speed railway for 280–320 km/h (175–200 mph) should be built between Stockholm–Linköping–Jönköping–Gothenburg and between Jönköping–Malmö–Copenhagen. The plan is to ease the situation on the existing railways that are relatively congested, combined with better travel times between both the largest three cities in Sweden, as well as fast regional trains between the cities along the routes (which today in many cases have no or slow railways).

An informal date suggestion by the Banverket is operation by year 2030. For two parts (Södertälje–Linköping and Mölnlycke–Bollebygd) detailed planning is done, and they are expected to have construction start by around 2017 and be in operation by around 2025.

Many of the newly built railway lines in Sweden are adapted for speeds up to 250 km/h (155 mph), such as Botniabanan, Grödingebanan, Mälarbanan, Svealandsbanan, Västkustbanan, and Vänernbanan. The problem that is slowing down high-speed rail in Sweden is the present signaling system (ATC), which does not allow speeds over 200 km/h (125 mph). It can be upgraded, but it will not be done since it shall be replaced by the European signaling system ERTMS level 2 on major lines in the near future, allowing high speeds up to 250 km/h (155 mph). ERTMS level 2 has been installed and is being tried out on Botniabanan, and that railway allows 250 km/h (155 mph), although no passenger train goes above 200 km/h (125 mph) for now. The train set Bombardier Regina (X55) has been delivered to the rail company SJ with the max speed of 200 km/h (125 mph) but with the option to upgrade the EMU to 250 km/h (155 mph) when possible. These trains haven't got increased speed as of 2022, but in 2022, SJ ordered twenty-five SJ 250 trainsets (based on the Zefiro Express platform) which would be capable of going 250 km/h (155 mph).

There are five major high-speed projects proposed in Sweden with speeds between 250–350 km/h (155–217 mph).

- The North Bothnia Line (Norrbotniabanan): Umeå–Luleå, is a future major rail project that will be built for 250 km/h (155 mph) with mixed passenger and freight traffic in northern Sweden, mainly to relieve the highly congested and old single track Main Line Through Upper Norrland increase freight traffic, and greatly speed up passenger traffic along the coast.
- The East Link (Ostlänken): Järna–Linköping, which would relieve the congested and slow conventional main lines on the stretch Järna-Linköping, Southern Main Line.
- The Gothia line (Götalandsbanan): Gothenburg–Borås–Jönköping–Linköping, connecting to Ostlänken. It would reduce travel time Gothenburg-Stockholm from 3.05 h to 2h, and much improve some regional travel times.
- The Europe Line (Europabanan/Europaspåret): Jönköping–Hässleholm and Helsingborg. The discussed extension to Helsingør (Tunnel under Øresund) and Copenhagen, is now (2016) unlikely due to Danish resistance.
- Hässleholm–Lund. The existing line is fast at around 200 km/h (125 mph), but congested with mix of local and high-speed trains. A new parallel high-speed railway between these cities is planned in detail

In late 2022, the then newly elected centre-right Swedish government decided to completely abandon Sweden's high-speed rail project due to rising costs. Its new directive to the Swedish Transport Administration (Trafikverket) in late December stated that Trafikverket shall pause planning of all sections and analyse how costs could be lowered for the Borås–Gothenburg, Ostlänken (East Link project; Stockholm – Linköping) and Europaspåret (Jönköping – Hässleholm). It motivated this by the rising costs and wanting to increase regional passenger services, therefore not wanting to complete the whole high speed railway network project. However, Trafikverket has stated several times that it is impossible to further increase services on most lines where its needed due to full capacity on both the Southern Main Line and Western Main Line. Critics has pointed out that this makes it harder to increase railway cargo traffic, going against Swedens and the EU's promises to lower emissions. Also, a partial upgrade of the mainlines from double-track to four-track railway on busy sections, instead of building new double-track lines, would lead to major disturbances during the period of construction, as well as creating single points of failure where a large part of railway traffic would be halted if for instance an accident occurs on the line.

However, the government later chose to continue parts of the high-speed rail projects such as the Ostlänken (The East Link) project, Gothenburg–Borås double tracks, and Hässleholm–Lund quad tracks.

Line	Speed	Length	Construction began	Expected start of revenue services
The North Bothnia Line; Norrbotniabanan	250 km/h (155 mph)	270 km	2018 (Umeå–Dåva); 2026 (Dåva–Skellefteå); 2033 Planned (Skellefteå–Luleå)	2026; 2032 or 2036–2038 (Dåva–Skellefteå); TBD (Skellefteå–Luleå)
The East Link; Ostlänken	250 km/h (155 mph)	160 km	November 2024	2035
Gothenburg–Borås Double Tracks	250 km/h (155 mph)	60 km	2029–2031	2039–2041
Hässleholm–Lund Quad Tracks	250 km/h (155 mph)	60 km	No earlier than 2034; Maybe 2031–2032 (Klostergården–Stångby)	≈2040

== South-east ==
=== Turkey ===
Turkish HSR Network: High-speed rail lines in service, those under construction, and those in the planning stages

Turkey started building high-speed rail lines in 2003 aiming a double-track high-speed rail network through the country allowing a maximum speed of 250 km/h (155 mph) Only the planned line between Istanbul, Edirne and Kapıkule is situated in the European part of the country.

The first line that was built aimed to connect Istanbul to Ankara (via Eskişehir) reducing the travel time from 6–7 hours to 3.5 hours. The Eskişehir-Ankara line started operating regular services on 14 March 2009 with a maximum speed of 250 km/h (155 mph), being the first High Speed Rail Service in Turkey making the Turkish State Railways the 6th European national rail company to offer HSR services (although these are situated in the Asian part of the country). The Eskişehir-Istanbul(Pendik) line is inaugurated in 2014 and the line extended to Halkalı in European side with Marmaray project via Marmaray Tunnel on 12 March 2019.

The Ankara–Konya line construction began in 2006 and inaugurated in 2011. The travel time was cut to 70 minutes on this route. The Konya–Karaman route also began construction in 2016 and was inaugurated in February 2021. The construction of the Ankara–Kırıkkale–Yozgat–Sivas line began in February 2009 and inaugurated on 26 April 2023. The travel time between Ankara and Sivas is cut from 12 hours to 2.5 hours. Several other HSR line projects between major cities such as Ankara–Afyon–Uşak–İzmir, Ankara–Kayseri, Bilecik–Bursa–Bandırma, Istanbul–Edirne–Kapıkule (Bulgarian border), Karaman–Ulukışla and Mersin–Adana–Osmaniye –Gaziantep lines are in construction phase. In addition Eskişehir–Afyon–Antalya, Sivas–Erzincan and Aksaray–Ulukışla–Yenice lines are planned to be built in the coming years. The Antalya–Alanya–Konya and Erzincan–Erzurum–Kars lines are also in planning phase.

The first 12 high-speed trainsets are ordered from CAF company, Spain. Several new trainsets from Siemens were also bought for the Ankara-Konya line, now operating in all HSR lines in Turkey.

Line	Speed	Length	Construction began	Start of revenue services
Operational
Ankara–Istanbul - Phase I (Ankara-Eskisehir)	250 km/h (155 mph)	245 km (152 mi)	2003	March 2009
Ankara–Istanbul - Phase II (Eskisehir-Istanbul)	250 km/h (155 mph)	289 km (180 mi)	2003	2014
Ankara–Konya	250 km/h (155 mph)	309 km (192 mi)	2006	April 2011
Ankara–Sivas	250 km/h (155 mph)	446 km (277 mi)	2009	April 2023
Konya–Karaman	200 km/h (124 mph)	102 km (63 mi)	2009	2021
Under construction
Bandırma–Bursa–Osmaneli	200 km/h (124 mph)	201 km (125 mi)	2012	expected 2025 (Osmaneli to Bursa) 2028 (Bursa to Bandırma)
Ankara (Polatlı)–İzmir	250 km/h (155 mph)	505 km (314 mi)	2012	expected 2027 (Ankara to Afyonkarahisar) 2028 (AfyonKarahisar to İzmir)
Karaman–Ulukışla	200 km/h (124 mph)	135 km (84 mi)	2016	expected 2026
Mersin–Yenice-Adana–Gaziantep	200 km/h (124 mph)	311 km (193 mi)	2020	expected 2027
Istanbul (Halkalı)–Kapıkule (Bulgarian border)	200 km/h (124 mph)	229 km (142 mi)	2019	expected 2025 (Çerkezköy to Kapıkule) 2028 (Halkalı to Çerkezköy)
Yerköy–Kayseri	250 km/h (155 mph)	142 km (88 mi)	2023	expected 2028
Kırıkkale–Çorum-Samsun - Phase I (Kırıkkale Delice–Çorum)	250 km/h (155 mph)	120 km (75 mi)	2024	expected 2028
Ankara–Istanbul - Unfinished sections	250 km/h (155 mph)	20 km (12 mi)	2003	expected 2028
Sivas–Erzincan - Phase I (Sivas-Zara)	250 km/h (155 mph)	74 km (46 mi)	2023	expected 2028
Project development completed / planning phase
Ankara–Istanbul - Super High Speed	350 km/h (217 mph)	344 km (214 mi)		
Gebze–Yavuz Sultan Selim Bridge-Çatalca - North Marmara	250 km/h (155 mph)	120 km (75 mi)		
Kırıkkale–Çorum-Samsun - Phase II (Çorum-Samsun)	250 km/h (155 mph)	173 km (107 mi)		
Aksaray–Ulukışla-Yenice	250 km/h (155 mph)	192 km (119 mi)		
Gaziantep–Şanlıurfa	200 km/h (124 mph)	136 km (85 mi)		
Şanlıurfa–Mardin	200 km/h (124 mph)	180 km (110 mi)		
Sivas–Çetinkaya-Malatya	200 km/h (124 mph)	224 km (139 mi)		

=== Greece ===
Development of a modern rail network for Greece has been a major goal since the 1990s. In 1996, construction of what is currently known as the P.A.Th.E./P. was given the go-ahead. The line, which should have opened by 2004, would link Patras, Athens, Thessaloniki and the Greece–North Macedonia and Greece–Bulgaria borders in Idomeni and Promachonas respectively. The project faced lack of funding and construction difficulties. The Athens-Thessaloniki section has been upgraded with the aim to reduce the travel time by three hours. However, signalling and safety issues remained unresolved, as it was manifested by the Tempi train crash of 28 February 2023. The target to reach a travel time of 3 hours 20 minutes has not been attained yet and it remains unknown when trains will reach high speeds. As of 2026, the Athens-Thessaloniki section has reopened, while the line to Patras is under construction.

Line	Speed	Length	Construction began	Expected start of revenue services
Patras–Athens–Thessaloniki–borders with North Macedonia & Bulgaria	160–200 km/h (99–124 mph)	approx. 700 km (430 mi)	1994	2022 (parts already in operation)

=== Romania ===
November 2007, Romania and Hungary agreed to build a high-speed line between their capital cities Budapest and Bucharest which would be a part of a larger transportation corridor Paris-Vienna-Budapest-Bucharest-Constanța. As of 2023, the railway from Bucharest to Constanța support speeds up to 160 km/h (99 mph). The plan for a high-speed railway through Budapest-Arad-Sibiu-Brașov-Bucharest-Constanța was officially included in the revised TEN-T plan in October 2013 as part of the Rhine-Danube Corridor. In 2022, the Romanian Ministry of Transport and Infrastructure announced a 120 million euros feasibility study for the construction of a high-speed line connecting Bucharest to Constanța and the Port of Constanța, as well as a line to Budapest, making use of the European Union Recovery Instrument following the COVID-19 pandemic. The study is planned to be finished by 2026. Two variants of the line to Hungary are studied, including one through the Olt river Valley, passing Sibiu, Cluj and Oradea with a length of 590 kilometres and an estimated cost of 17 billion euros. The second variant is a hybrid approach, which includes sections of lower speeds taking into account geographical aspects and economic profitability. The journey between Budapest and Bucharest would be reduced from 11 hours to just 3.5 hours. The costs for the high-speed rail were in 2024 estimated at 17 billion euros.

== Central-Eastern Europe ==
=== Croatia ===
In early 2000s has the Croatian parliament passed a bill to build its first high-speed line, a new Botovo–Zagreb–Rijeka line, which would with later upgrades allow maximum speed of 250 km/h. The plan was to start building in 2007. But later plans from 2020 foresee only upgrades to 160 km/h.

=== Hungary ===
In January 2022, the Hungarian Government has announced it will conduct its first high-speed feasibility study on a new line capable of reaching speeds up to 250–300 km/h between Budapest and Cluj-Napoca in Transylvania, Romania.

In contrast, the upgrade of the Budapest–Belgrade railway will achieve high-speed travel only on the Serbian side, with speeds of up to 200 km/h, while the Hungarian section is being built for a maximum of 160 km/h. The construction of the Hungarian part of the railway, 152 km (94 mi), was started in October 2021 and is due to be completed by 2025. Once finished, the journey between Budapest and Belgrade is projected to be reduced to either 2 hours 40 minutes or 3 hours 30 minutes, depending on the source.

Regarding the rolling stock, in September 2022 the Hungarian Government has announced the purchase of 39 + 10 trains (composed of 7 carriages each) and 50 Siemens Vectron locomotives with the purpose of upgrading up to 2/3 of the existing long-distance passenger fleet running on domestic and international InterCity services of the Hungarian State Railways. The project foresees services similar to those provided by ÖBB's railjet services running in Austria as well as abroad, including between Budapest and Vienna (and forward to Munich or Zurich). The company plans to offer upgraded InterCity services on the following lines:

- Budapest–Miskolc–Nyíregyháza–Szolnok–Budapest loop
- Budapest–Pécs
- Budapest–Kecskemét–Szeged
- Budapest–Győr–Vienna (together with existing ÖBB railjet services)
- Budapest–Lake Balaton southern shore
- Budapest–Lake Balaton northern shore (after the line's electrification)
- Budapest–Prague
- Budapest–Warsaw
- Budapest–Belgrade
- possible services to the states of the Southern Balkans

The new rolling stock is capable of reaching running speeds up to 230 km/h (143 mph). However, currently the highest allowed speed limit in the country remains at 160 km/h on the Budapest–Hegyeshalom (Austrian border) line.

=== Poland ===
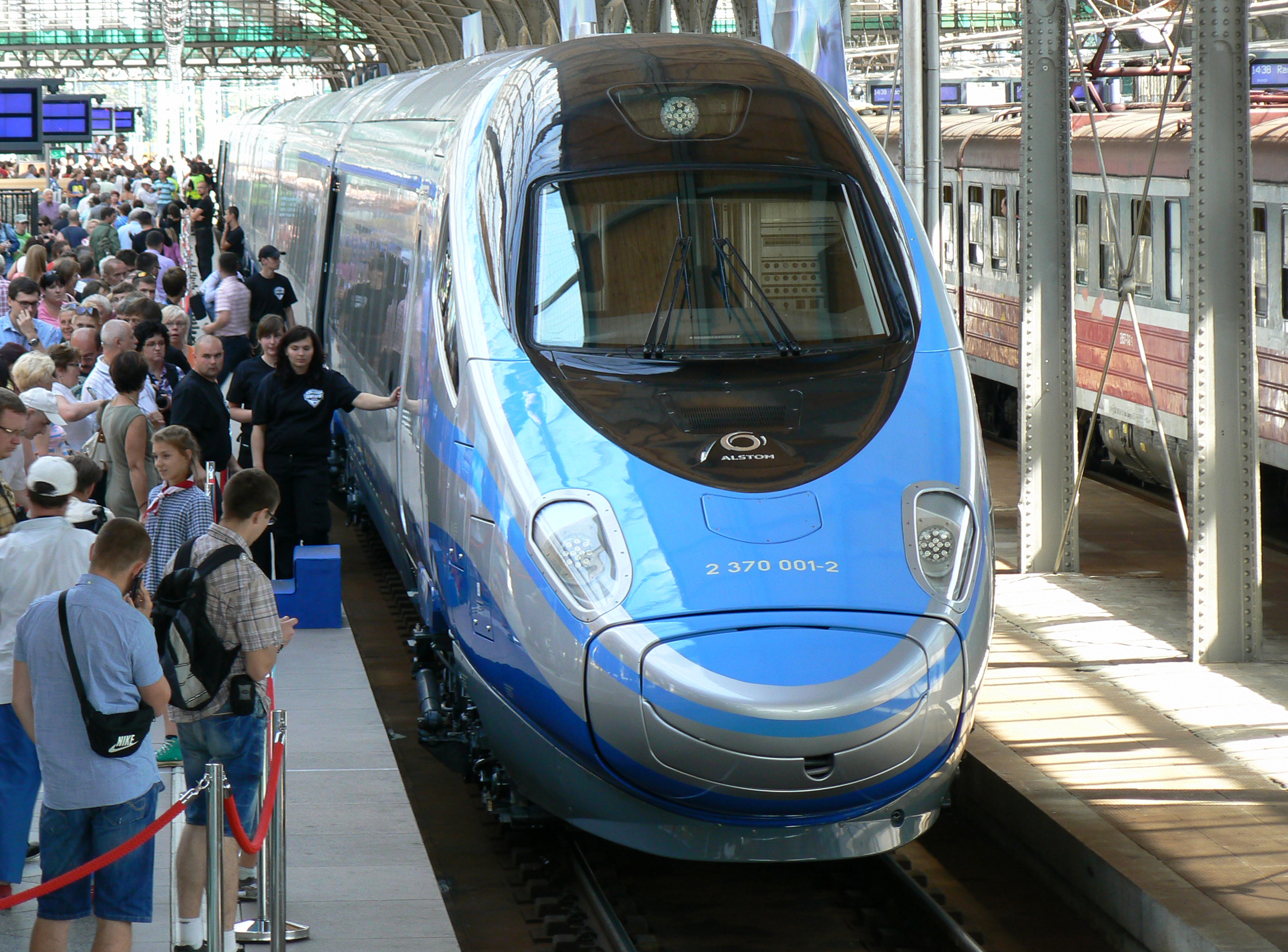
Polish Railways New Pendolino in Wrocław, western Poland

Today, the main cities of Poland are linked by railway transport reaching 160 km/h (99 mph). On 14 December 2014, Polish State Railways started passenger service trains PKP Pendolino ED250 operating 200 km/h (124 mph) speed on 80 km (50 mi) line Olszamowice-Zawiercie (part of railway line called Central Trunk Line (CMK) from Warsaw to Katowice). Currently it is the line with highest railway speed in Poland. Several other sections of the Central Trunk Line will soon allow speeds of 200 km/h (124 mph) (with a current speed record set up by Pendolino Train on 21 November 2013 in Poland of 293 km/h (182 mph)). According to recent plans of PKP-PLK, sections of CMK between Warsaw and Gdańsk (145 km (90 mi)) and Warsaw-Kraków (additional 80 km (50 mi)) will be added to present section from no later than December 2015. That will make about 300 km (186 mi) of railways available for speed of 200 km/h (124 mph). Other sections will start operating at 200 km/h (124 mph) in 2016.

Polish Railways for many years did not possess the rolling stock to achieve speeds over 160 km/h (99 mph). Polish Railways planned to buy Pendolino trains in 1998, but the contract was cancelled the following year by the Supreme Control Chamber due to financial losses by Polish Railways. However, a new contract with Alstom Transport worth 665 million euros was signed in May 2011 and since December 2014, 20 Pendolino units service the Katowice/Kraków–Gdynia line and Wrocław/Warsaw line. However, Pendolinos in Poland are not equipped with tilting system, which would not be very useful on the flat Polish Plains. The lack of a tilting system for the Pendolino train along with choosing Alstom Transportation despite domestic train producers was a subject of broad debate in media and Polish Railways were heavily criticised for that purchase.

Other current plans call for a 'Y' line that will connect Warsaw, Łódź and Kalisz, with branches to Wrocław and Poznań. The geometric layout of the line will be designed to permit speeds of 360 km/h (224 mph). Construction was planned to begin around 2014 and finish in 2019. In the centre of the city of Łódź the 'Y' line will travel through a tunnel which will link two existing railway stations. One of them, Łódź Fabryczna, will be reconstructed as an underground station, work being scheduled to start in July 2010. In April 2009, four companies qualified for the second phase of a public tender to prepare a feasibility study for construction of the line. In April 2010, the tender for a feasibility study was awarded to a consortium led by Spanish company Ingenieria IDOM. The feasibility study project was granted €80 million in subsidy from European Union. The total cost of the line including construction and train sets was estimated at €6.9bn and is planned to be financed partially by EU subsidies.

In 2019, the program of the Solidarity Transport Hub (STH) or Central Communication/Transport Port (in Polish Centralny Port Komunikacyjny or CPK) was announced by the Polish government. This project envisages the construction of 2,000 km of high-speed railways as well as upgrades to 3,700 km of existing railways to connect the largest urban areas in Poland and surrounding countries. A new airport in central Poland will serve as the main transport hub for the entire country, with travel time by rail of under 2.5 hours to nearly all major Polish cities. The network will also connect Poland to the planned high-speed railway network of the Czech Republic and to Rail Baltica.

In 2020, the speed limit was raised to 200 km/h (124 mph) on the line from Warsaw to Gdynia.

=== Serbia ===
==== Connection with Hungary (Belgrade-Budapest) ====
As a result of negotiations between the two Central European countries and China, it was decided to build a high-speed line between their capital cities Budapest and Belgrade, as a part of a larger corridor Budapest-Belgrade-Niš-Skopje-Thessaloniki-Athens, by upgrading the current Budapest–Belgrade railway line to 200 km/h (124 mph) in Serbia and to 160 km/h (99 mph) in Hungary.

The construction of the railway line in Serbia started in September 2017, when the construction of the Čortanovci tunnel began. The 75 km (47 mi) railway for speed up to 200 km/h (124 mph) between Belgrade and Novi Sad opened on 19 March 2022 (this part was divided in two sections: as of 2018, the Belgrade - Stara Pazova 34.5 km (21.4 mi) section was planned to be finished in the end of 2020 and the Stara Pazova - Novi Sad 40.4 km (25.1 mi) section in November 2021). The construction of the 107.4 km (66.7 mi) section between Novi Sad and Subotica (Hungarian border) was started on 7 April 2022 and is due to be completed for the end of 2024. On 8 October 2025 the "Soko" high-speed line between Belgrade (via Novi Sad) and Subotica opened and runs with 9 departures daily. Its maximum speed is 200 km/h and the 181,6 kilometres between Belgrade and Subotica are covered in 1h19 minutes.

The construction of the Hungarian part of the railway, 152 km (94 mi), was started in October 2021 and is due to be completed by 2025. When the project is complete, the journey between Budapest and Belgrade should be reduced to 2h 40mn according to some sources and to 3h 30mn according to some others.

==== Further upgrades ====
After the realisation of a high speed line between Belgrade and Novi Sad, additional high speed connections within Serbia are planned as well as the modernisation of branch lines which will connect the main high speed line Subotica-Niš with neighbouring countries like North Macedonia and Bulgaria.

Line	Speed	Length	Start of revenue services
Belgrade - Novi Sad	200 km/h (125 mph)	75 km (47 mi)	19.03.2022
Novi Sad - Subotica	200 km/h (125 mph)	108.3 km (67.3 mi)	08.10.2025
Belgrade - Niš	200 km/h (125 mph)	230 km (140 mi)	Construction to start in June 2023. Completion expected for 2026 (partial) & 2029.
Subotica - Horgoš	160 km/h (100 mph)	26.6 km (16.5 mi)	01.08.2022
Niš - Dimitrovgrad	160 km/h (100 mph)	80 km (50 mi)	By 2025.
Niš - Preševo	160 km/h (100 mph)	157 km (98 mi)	Early 2026.

== Other high-speed projects ==
Several other countries in Europe have launched or planned high-speed rail programmes. Due to geographic challenges, these projects are likely to remain national in scope for the foreseeable future, without international links to existing high-speed networks.

=== Belarus ===
In 2017 Belarus authorities agreed to offer land territories to Chinese corporation CRCC for construction of a high-speed corridor between the EU and Russia through country territory. Chinese engineering companies are also interested in building highways and Russian high-speed railways running in connection with this route with possible interchange with the Moscow-Kazan high-speed corridor.

=== The Baltics ===
A north/south Rail Baltica line from Tallinn to Kaunas has been under construction since 2019 and is planned to be in service by 2030. The line will connect Tallinn and Kaunas via Pärnu, Riga and Panevėžys, while also providing connections to airports and railway terminals. The railway will be the first high-speed, 1435mm standard gauge railway in the Baltics. From Kaunas, it will be connected to the already existing high-speed network in Poland. Project speeds are 249 km/h (155 mph) for passenger trains and 120 km/h (75 mph) for freight traffic. About 85% of construction costs (totalling ca. 15.3 billion €) will be covered by the European Union, the rest will be paid jointly by the Estonian, Latvian and Lithuanian governments. Indirectly the railway may also link Helsinki, as there are proposals for a Tallinn-Helsinki railway tunnel.

The project has been surrounded with controversy in all states, mainly due to environmental concerns and the cost of the project. According to surveys conducted to Estonia, public support remains around 60%, with the percent higher amongst people living in Tallinn and amongst people with higher education, while the percent drops in rural areas. Controversy has also surrounded the choice of route, with some proposing that the railway should also go through Tartu and Vilnius. However this has been dismissed as they are large detours, would increase the cost and bring no sufficient benefit.

=== Ireland ===
In 2020 the Irish Government confirmed it will be launching a study into an approximately 500 km (311 mi) high-speed railway from Belfast via Dublin to Cork and Limerick, which could cost around €15 billion.

=== Portugal ===
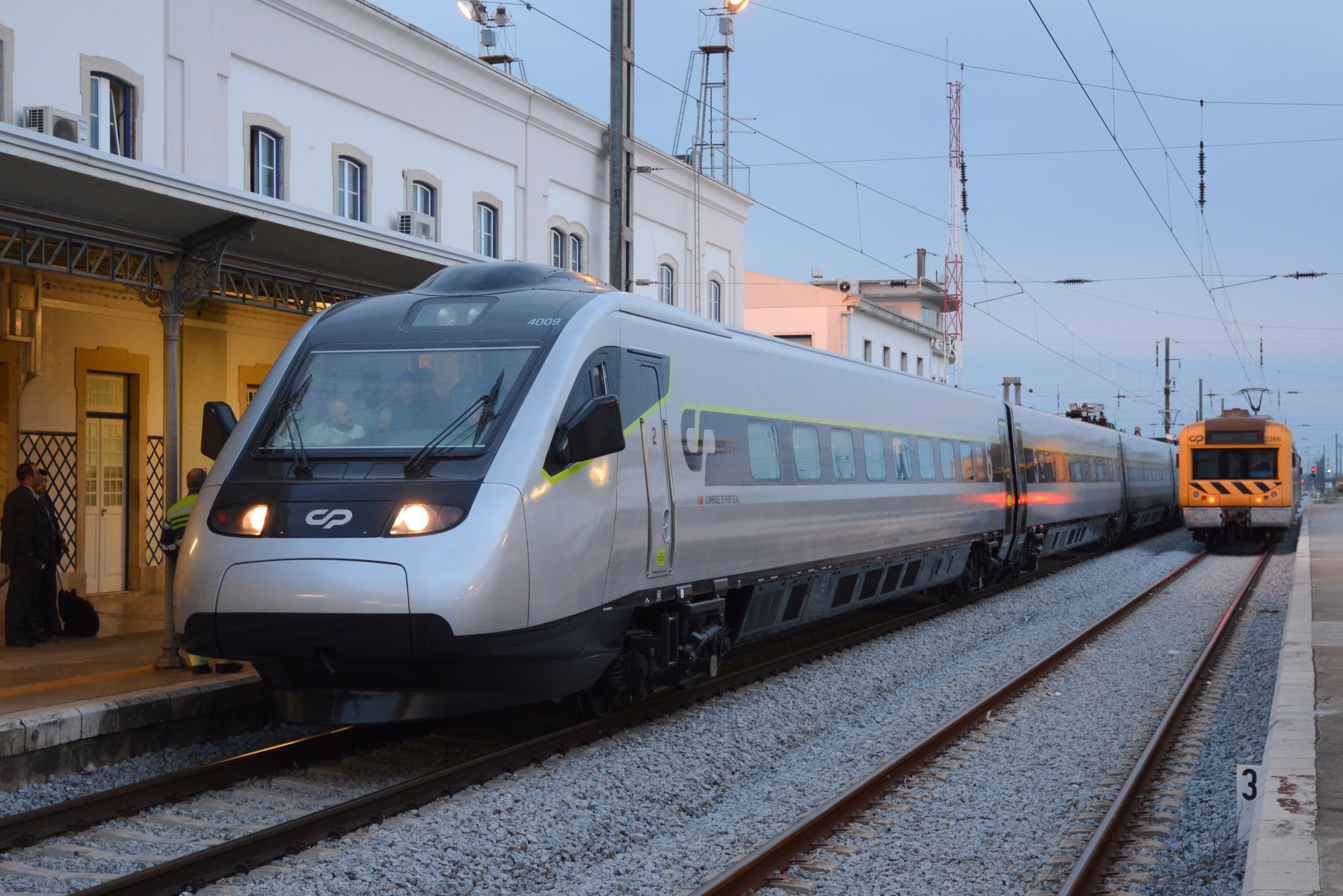
An Alfa Pendular train when its current livery was introduced (2017)

Since the 1990s, the Italian tilting train, the Pendolino, runs the Alfa Pendular service, connecting Portugal's mainland from the north border to the Algarve, its southern counterpart, at a speed of up to 220 km/h (137 mph).

High-speed connections between Spain and Portugal have been agreed upon and planned, but initial works had yet to begin when the projects were cancelled in 2012. The Portuguese government had approved the construction of six high-speed lines from the capital Porto to Lisbon, from Porto to Vigo, from Aveiro to Salamanca, from Lisbon to Faro, from Faro to Seville and from Lisbon to Madrid, bringing the two countries' capital cities within three hours of each other, at a max speed of 350 km/h (217 mph).

On 8 May 2010, The Portuguese Transport Minister signed off the 40-year PPP covering the construction of the Lisbon–Madrid high-speed line. The total cost was then put at €1.359bn for a double-track standard gauge line from Lisbon to the Spanish border. Also included was a broad gauge line from the Portuguese Port of Sines to the Spanish border. The line was expected to open by the end of 2013 and would reduce the journey time between Lisbon and Madrid to 2 hours 45 minutes, the project however, was cancelled in March 2012. In October 2020 the government proposed a 75-minute rail link between the country's two main cities, Lisbon and Porto. Also, the Atlantic Axis of the Northwestern Peninsula–Eixo Atlântico do Noroeste Peninsular high-speed railway connection between Portugal and Galicia (covering all the main cities between Setúbal-Vigo) was favoured as of 2020.

Line	Speed	Length	Expected start of revenue services
Lisbon-Évora-Spanish border (to Madrid)	250 km/h (155 mph)	90 km (56 mi) Évora-Elvas	New high-speed line Évora-Elvas (90 km) to be inaugurated in 2024 with Lisbon-Bajadoz service. Initial project cancelled in 2012, new project Évora-Spanish border announced in 2017.
Porto-Lisbon	300 km/h (186 mph)	292 km (181 mi)	Early project cancelled and repurposed in 2020.
Porto–Spanish border (to Vigo)	250 km/h (155 mph)	125 km (78 mi)	Initial project cancelled and repurposed in 2020.

=== Russia ===
Two experimental high-speed trainsets (designed for 200 km/h (124 mph) operation) were built in 1974: locomotive-hauled RT-200 ("Russkaya Troika") and ER-200 EMU. The RT-200 set made only experimental runs in 1975 and 1980 and was discontinued due to unavailability of the ChS-200 high-speed locomotive – they were only delivered later. The ER-200 EMU was put into regular service in 1984. In 1992 a second ER-200 trainset was built in Riga. Both sets were in operation till 28 February 2009.

Instead of these outdated domestic trainsets, imported trainsets have been in operation since March 2009. Siemens Velaro trainsets have operated since 2009 between Saint Petersburg and Moscow, at speeds of up to 250 km/h (155 mph) and since 2010 between Nizhny Novgorod and Moscow, where service is limited to 160 km/h (99 mph). The Pendolino Sm6, similar to Finnish high-speed trains, began operation in 2010 between Saint Petersburg and Helsinki at up to 220 km/h (137 mph).

In February 2010 RZhD announced it would shortly release a proposal for a new high-speed line to be built parallel to the existing line between Saint Petersburg and Moscow due to congestion on the existing line. In April 2010 it was confirmed that a new Moscow–Saint Petersburg high-speed line with length of 660 km (410 mi) and running speed of up to 400 km/h (249 mph) was envisioned, cutting the journey time from 3h 45m to 2h 30m. It is expected the line to include stops at both Saint Petersburg and Moscow region airports. On 28 January 2011, Russia announced that the high speed rail link between Moscow and Saint Petersburg will be finished on time for the 2018 FIFA World Cup. The cost is expected to be "somewhere around" 10 to 15 billion euros, not including land purchases, said Denis Muratov, general director of High-Speed Rail Lines. The state will shoulder up to 70 percent of construction costs, with the remainder coming from outside investors. Most of that money is likely to come from international financial institutions, including the World Bank and the European Bank for Reconstruction and Development, Muratov said. Sberbank, VTB and VEB may also be interested. In fact, construction of this new Moscow–Saint Petersburg high-speed line didn't start.

Instead of it, on 13 May 2015 the Russian government announced that China Railway Group Ltd will build a 400 km/h (249 mph) high speed rail link from Moscow to Kazan by 2018 in time for the 2018 FIFA World Cup where Kazan is one of the cities that will host some of the football matches. The cost of the Moscow–Kazan link is estimated at $21.4 billion. Train travel from Moscow to Kazan, the capital of the Republic of Tatarstan, will be shortened to just 3.5 hours instead of the more than 14 hours that it takes now. The opening date was later changed to 2020.

Line	Speed	Length	Expected start of revenue services
Moscow–Kazan	400 km/h (249 mph)	770 km (478 mi) (301 km (187 mi) initial section)	2020 (postponed after crisis)

== In development ==
=== Cross border ===
Countries	Line	Speed (km/h)	Length	Construction start year	Expected start of revenue services
Austria/Italy	Brenner Base Tunnel	250 km/h (155 mph)	56 km (35 mi)	2006	2032
Finland/Russia/Norway	Arctic Railway	250 km/h (155 mph)	526 km (327 mi)	2025?	2030?
Germany/Switzerland	Karlsruhe–Basel high-speed railway	250 km/h (155 mph)	182 km (113 mi)	1987	1993–2030
Germany/Czech Republic	Prague–Dresden railway	200–320 km/h (125–200 mph)	70 km (43 mi)+	2025	2030–2035
Germany/Denmark	Fehmarn Belt Fixed Link	200 km/h (125 mph)	18 km (11 mi)	2021	2029
Portugal/Spain	Lisbon–Madrid high-speed rail line	350 km/h (220 mph)	640 km (400 mi)	Cancelled, upgrade of existing railway and changing the gauge chosen instead	2030
Estonia/Latvia/Lithuania	Rail Baltica	250 km/h (155 mph)	870 km (540 mi)	2018	2030
Estonia/Finland	Helsinki-Tallinn Tunnel	Undecided	103 km (64 mi)	2025+	2040 (guess)
United Kingdom/Ireland	Celtic Crossing	250 km/h (155 mph)	41 km (25 mi) to 110 km (68 mi)	Cancelled	2030+
Portugal/Spain	Porto–Vigo high-speed rail line	250 km/h (155 mph)	125 km (78 mi)	Proposed	2030

=== Country-specific ===
Country	Line	Speed	Length	Construction began to begin	Expected start of revenue services
Austria	Koralm Railway	250 km/h (155 mph)	125 km (78 mi)	2001	2025
Austria	North Railway	200 km/h (124 mph)	77.9 km (48.4 mi)	Unknown	2030 (upgrading)
Austria	New Lower Inn Valley railway (extension)	250 km/h (155 mph)	90 km (55.9 mi)	Unknown	2030
Belgium	Line 25N	200 km/h (124 mph)	20 km (12.4 mi)	2012	2020–2027
Belgium	Line 50A	200 km/h (124 mph)	28.8 km (17.9 mi)	2018	Unknown (upgrading)
Belgium	Line 96N	200 km/h (124 mph)	13.6 km (8.5 mi)	1997	Unknown (upgrading)
Czech; Republic	Prague–České Budějovice	200 km/h (124 mph)	166 km (103 mi)	2020	2023–2026
Czech; Republic	Praha–Poříčany	200 km/h (124 mph)	25.92 km (16.11 mi)	2030	2035
Czech; Republic	Brno–Přerov	200 km/h (124 mph)	90.1 km (56.0 mi)	2025	2033
Czech; Republic	Ejpovice Tunnel	160 km/h (99 mph) (200 km/h (124 mph) planned)	4.15 km (2.58 mi)	2018	2022
Czech; Republic	Praha–Plzeň	160 km/h (99 mph) (200 km/h (124 mph) planned)	102.85 km (63.91 mi)	2016 (upgrading)	2026
Czech; Republic	Praha-Brno-Ostrava	350 km/h (217 mph)	350 km (217 mi)	2027	2035
Czech; Republic	Praha-Beroun	300 km/h (186 mph)	24.7 km (15.3 mi)	2028	2035
Czech; Republic	Brno–Břeclav	350 km/h (217 mph)	50 km (31.1 mi)	2028	2031
Czech; Republic	Hradec Králové–Polish Border	350 km/h (217 mph)	50 km (31.1 mi)	2040	2045
Denmark	Ringsted-Fehmarn railway	200 km/h (124 mph)	115 km (71 mi)	2017	2029
Denmark	Ringsted-Odense railway (upgrading)	200 km/h (124 mph)	96 km (59.7 mi)	2023	2029
Denmark	Kavslunde-Odense railway	250 km/h (155 mph)	35 km (22 mi)	2023	2029
Finland	Helsinki–Turku high-speed railway	300 km/h (186 mph)	95 km (59.0 mi)	(planned)	2031
Finland	East Rail Connection	300 km/h (186 mph)	126 km (78 mi)	(planned)	2027+
France	LGV Bordeaux–Toulouse	350 km/h (217 mph)	222 km (138 mi)	2019 (planned)	2032
France	LGV Bordeaux–Espagne (Dax to border)	350 km/h (217 mph)	60 km (37.3 mi)	Unknown	2034
France	LGV Montpellier–Perpignan	350 km/h (217 mph)	150 km (93 mi)	2021 (planned)	2027+
France	Ligne nouvelle Paris-Normandie	250 km/h (155 mph)	310 km (190 mi)	2027 (approved)	2035+
Germany	Rhine Railway Karlsruhe-Rastatt	250 km/h (155 mph)	30 km (19 mi)	2013	2026
Germany	Rhine Railway Offenburg-Basel	250 km/h (155 mph)	120 km (75 mi)	Unknown	2030
Germany	Kinzig Valley Railway (Hesse)	200 km/h (124 mph)	80.6 km (50.08 mi)	2007	2021 (upgrading)
Germany	Appenweier–Strasbourg railway	200 km/h (124 mph)	13.5 km (8.4 mi)	2010	2023 (upgrading)
Germany	Frankfurt-Manheim	300 km/h (186 mph)	85 km (52.8 mi)	2025	2030
Germany	Oberhausen–Arnhem railway	200 km/h (124 mph)	73 km (45.4 mi)	2014	Unknown (upgrading)
Germany	Stuttgart–Wendlingen high-speed railway	250 km/h (155 mph)	25 km (15.5 mi)	2014	2025
Germany	Ulm-Augsburg high-speed railway (parallel)	250 km/h (155 mph)	70 km (43.5 mi)	2023	2030
Germany	Hanau-Gelnhausen high-speed railway	300 km/h (186 mph)	55 km (34.2 mi)	2025	2030
Germany	Lübeck–Puttgarden railway	200 km/h (124 mph)	88.6 km (55.1 mi)	2022	2028 (upgrading)
Germany	Lübeck–Hamburg railway	200 km/h (124 mph)	62.5 km (38.8 mi)	2020	2027 (upgrading)
Germany	Berlin–Frankfurt an der Oder	200 km/h (124 mph)	81.2 km (50.5 mi)	Unknown	2027 (upgrading)
Germany	Bielefeld–Hannover high-speed railway	300 km/h (186 mph)	100 km (62.1 mi)	Unknown	2030
Germany	Uelzen–Langwedel railway	200 km/h (124 mph)	97.4 km (60.5 mi)	Unknown	2030
Germany	Regensburg–Passau railway	200 km/h (124 mph)	57.3 km (35.6 mi)	2006	2030
Germany	Berlin–Görlitz railway	200 km/h (124 mph)	114.7 km (71.3 mi)	2023	2027
Germany	Wunstorf–Bremen railway	200 km/h (124 mph)	122.3 km (76.0 mi)	Unknown	2030 (upgrading approved)
Germany	Stendal–Uelzen railway	200 km/h (124 mph)	107.5 km (66.8 mi)	Unknown	2030
Greece	Egnatia Railway	250 km/h (155 mph)	565 km (351 mi)	Unknown	2028+
Greece	route to Albania	250 km/h (155 mph)	130 km (81 mi)	Unknown	Unknown
Hungary	Serbian Border-Budapest	160 km/h (99 mph)	152 km (94 mi)	2019	2023
Ireland	Dublin-Cork Railway	225 km/h (140 mph)	266 km (165 mi)	Early 2000s	2023+
Italy	Verona–Brenner	250 km/h (155 mph)	276 km (171 mi)	Unknown	2025
Italy	Tortona–Genoa high-speed railway	250 km/h (155 mph)	53 km (32.9 mi)	2013	2023
Italy	Naples–Foggia railway	200 km/h (124 mph)	194 km (121 mi)	2012	2026 (upgrading)
Netherlands	Rhine Railway	200 km/h (124 mph)	116.3 km (72.3 mi)	Unknown	2023
Netherlands	Lelylijn	250 km/h (155 mph)	120 km (74.6 mi)	Unknown	Before 2030
Norway	Drammen–Kobbervik	250 km/h (155 mph)	7.8 km (4.8 mi)	2019	2025
Norway	Nykirke-Barkåker	250 km/h (155 mph)	13.6 km (8.5 mi)	2020	2025
Norway	Kleverud-Åkersvika	250 km/h (155 mph)	29.7 km (18.5 mi)	2022	2027
Poland	Y-line	250 km/h (155 mph)	450 km (279.6 mi)	2021 (claimed)	2027-2030+
Poland	CMK Północ / PKP rail line 5	250 km/h (155 mph)	295 km (183.3 mi)	2025+	2030+
Poland	Shortcut in PKP rail line 9	250 km/h (155 mph)	33 km (20.5 mi)	2020+	2025+
Portugal	Linha do Sul (another section)	220 km/h (140 mph)	50 km (31.1 mi)	2015	2030
Portugal	South Axis	250 km/h (155 mph)	374.7 km (232.8 mi)	2015	2030
Portugal	High-speed mainline	300 km/h (186 mph)	298 km (185 mi)	Unknown	2030
Romania	Bucharest-Cluj	200 km/h (124 mph)	497 km (309 mi)	2020 (originally planned 2019)	2025
Russia	Gor'kovskaya Railway (Moscow - Nizhny Novgorod)	200 km/h (124 mph)	421 km (262 mi)	2021	2024
Slovakia	Devínska Nová Ves-Czech border	200 km/h (124 mph)	57.8 km (35.9 mi)	2017	2030
Spain	Mediterranean High Speed Corridor: Andalusia–Murcia–Valencia–Catalonia–French border	200 km/h (124 mph)	250–350 km/h (155–217 mph)	+1,000 km (621 mi)	2016–2020–2030
Spain	Madrid–(Cáceres–Mérida–Badajoz)–Lisbon	200 km/h (124 mph)	350 km/h (217 mph)	640 km (400 mi)	Unknown
Spain	L.A.V. Madrid–Santander	200 km/h (124 mph)	Unknown	Unknown	Unknown
Spain	León–Gijón high-speed rail line	350 km/h (217 mph)	Unknown	2009	2020+
Spain	Murcia–Almería high-speed rail line	300 km/h (186 mph)	184.3 km (114.5 mi)	Unknown	2026
Spain	L.A.V. Burgos–Vitoria-Gasteiz	350 km/h (217 mph)	98.8 km (61.4 mi)	2009	2023
Spain	Basque Y	250 km/h (155 mph)	175 km (109 mi)	Unknown	2027
Switzerland	Jura Foot Railway	104.5 km (64.9 mi)	Unknown (upgrading)	2025–2030	?
Switzerland	Lausanne–Geneva railway	66.18 km (41.12 mi)	Unknown (upgrading)	2025–2030	?
Switzerland	Simplon Railway	191.41 km (118.94 mi)	Unknown (upgrading)	2025–2030	?
Sweden	The North Bothnia Line; Norrbotniabanan	250 km/h (155 mph)	270 km	2018 (Umeå–Dåva); 2026 (Dåva–Skellefteå); 2033 Planned (Skellefteå–Luleå)	2026 (Umeå–Dåva); 2032 or 2036–2038 (Dåva–Skellefteå); TBD (Skellefteå–Luleå)
Sweden	The West Link; Västlänken	100 km/h (62 mph)	6 km	May 2018	Late 2026 (Central station); 2030 (Full)
Sweden	The East Link; Ostlänken	250 km/h (155 mph)	160 km	November 2024	2035
Sweden	Gothenburg–Borås double tracks	250 km/h (155 mph)?	60 km	2029–2031	2039–2041
Sweden	Hässleholm–Lund quad tracks	250 km/h (155 mph)?	60 km	No earlier than 2034	≈2040
Ukraine	Polish border-Lviv-Kyiv-Odesa	250 km/h (155 mph)	900 km (559 mi)	2021 (claimed)	2030
United Kingdom	High Speed 2	362 km/h (225 mph)	230 km (143 mi)	2017	2031
United Kingdom	High Speed 2 (phase 2)	362 km/h (225 mph)	390 km (242 mi)	Cancelled	2040
United Kingdom	Northern Powerhouse Rail	230 km/h (143 mph)	65 km (40.4 mi)	2022 (planned)	2035+
United Kingdom	Reading–Taunton line	201 km/h (125 mph)	173.21 km (107.63 mi)	Unknown (proposed)	Before 2043
United Kingdom	Bristol–Exeter line	201 km/h (125 mph)	121.36 km (75.41 mi)	Unknown (proposed)	Before 2043
United Kingdom	South West Main Line	201 km/h (125 mph)	239.8 km (149.0 mi)	Unknown (proposed)	Before 2043
United Kingdom	Coventry–Nuneaton-Leicester lines	201 km/h (125 mph)	40 km (25 mi)	Unknown (proposed)	Before 2036
United Kingdom	Crewe–Derby line	201 km/h (125 mph)	83 km (51.6 mi)	Unknown (proposed)	Before 2036
United Kingdom	Waverley Route	Unknown	158.1 km (98.2 mi)	Unknown (proposed)	Before 2035
United Kingdom	Welsh Marches line	201 km/h (125 mph)	225 km (140 mi)	Unknown (proposed)	Before 2036

== See also ==
- Milan–Paris Frecciarossa – a passenger railway service running between Milano Centrale and Paris Gare de Lyon
- Rail transport in Europe
- Trans-European high-speed rail network
