= Baltic–Adriatic Corridor =

European railway initiative

Route information
- Length: 1,800 km (1,100 mi)

Major junctions
- From: (Poland) Gdańsk
- To: (Italy) Ravenna

Location
- Countries: Poland; Czech Republic; Slovakia; Austria; Italy

Highway system
- International E-road network; A Class; B Class

The Baltic–Adriatic Corridor or Baltic–Adriatic Axis (German: Baltisch-Adriatische Achse, Italian: Corridoio Baltico-Adriatico) is a European initiative to create a high capacity north–south railway and road corridor connecting Gdańsk on the Baltic Sea with Bologna and the Adriatic. The line traverses Poland, the Czech Republic, Slovakia, Austria and Italy, connecting heavily industrialized areas such as Warsaw and the Upper Silesian Coal Basin, Vienna and south-east Austria, and Northern Italy. It developed from the Trans-European Transport Network (TEN-T) project No. 23 of a Gdańsk-Vienna railway axis set up in 2003. Carrying 24 million tons of freight per year, the Baltic–Adriatic Corridor is considered among the most important trans-Alpine lines in Europe.

== Description ==
=== Railway lines ===
- Gdańsk Główny railway station – Warszawa Wschodnia railway station (Polish State Railways PKP rail line 9)
- Warszawa Centralna – Grodzisk Mazowiecki (PKP rail line 1, former Warsaw–Vienna railway)
- Grodzisk Mazowiecki – Zawiercie (PKP rail line 4)
- Zawiercie – Katowice (PKP rail line 1)
- Katowice – Czechowice-Dziedzice (PKP rail line 139)

- Czechowice-Dziedzice – Zebrzydowice/Petrovice u Karviné
- Petrovice u Karviné – Bohumín – Ostrava (former Emperor Ferdinand Northern Railway)
- Ostrava - Brno
- Brno - Vienna
- Zwardoń – Čadca (ŽSR line 129) – Žilina (ŽSR line 127)
- Žilina – Bratislava (ŽSR line 120)
- Bratislava – Vienna (ŽSR line 100/ÖBB line 910)

- Vienna - Graz (Southern Railway)

=== Areas served ===
- Gdańsk Bay with the seaports of Gdańsk and Gdynia
- Warsaw metropolitan area, with connection to Rail Baltica
- Łódź
- Katowice-Ostrava metropolitan area (Katowice, Ostrava)
- Olomouc urban zone
- Brno metropolitan area
- Vienna metropolitan area (the city and surrounding Lower Austria), with connection to the Magistrale for Europe
- Bratislava
- Styria, the city of Graz, and Carinthia
- Trieste and Udine in the Friuli-Venezia Giulia region
- Veneto with (Venice and Padua)
- Emilia-Romagna with Bologna and Ravenna
- Marche (Ancona)

== History ==
Following an initiative by the Austrian transportation ministry in 2006, Poland, the Czech Republic, Slovakia, Austria and Italy signed a Letter of Intent to expand the TEN-T railway project 23, in order to form the Baltic–Adriatic Corridor. The goals of the initiative were to eliminate bottlenecks, create intermodal linking of traffic flows and connect with other European main corridors, eliminate structural and geographical disadvantages for under-served areas (such as the southern Austrian states of Styria and Carinthia), increase the competitiveness of rail with roadway (truck) transport and to realize the market development potentials of passenger traffic along the corridor.

14 European countries signed a declaration calling for implementation of the Baltic–Adriatic Corridor between Gdańsk and Bologna in 2009. Work began in late 2008 on the first phase of the Austrian Koralm Railway between Graz and Klagenfurt, including the 33 km (21 mi) long Koralm Tunnel, the largest infrastructure element of the line. The Koralm Railway was opened in December 2025. In 2012 construction of the Semmering Base Tunnel started, expected to open in 2030, bypassing the gradients of the Semmering Pass.

By resolution of 19 October 2011, the Baltic Adriatic Corridor was linked with the TEN-T Rail Baltica project from Warsaw via Kaunas, Riga and Tallinn to Helsinki (including the proposed Helsinki to Tallinn Tunnel). In a discussion with Member of the European Parliament Debora Serrachiani on 24 April 2012, the Italian Minister of Infrastructure and Transport Corrado Passera reaffirmed the Italian government's commitment to extend the Baltic–Adriatic Corridor as far as Ancona, 325 km (202 mi) south of Venice.
