= High-speed rail in Austria =

The West railway between the capital Vienna and Salzburg is being upgraded. Most new sections have a continuous maximum design speed of 250 km/h (155 mph).

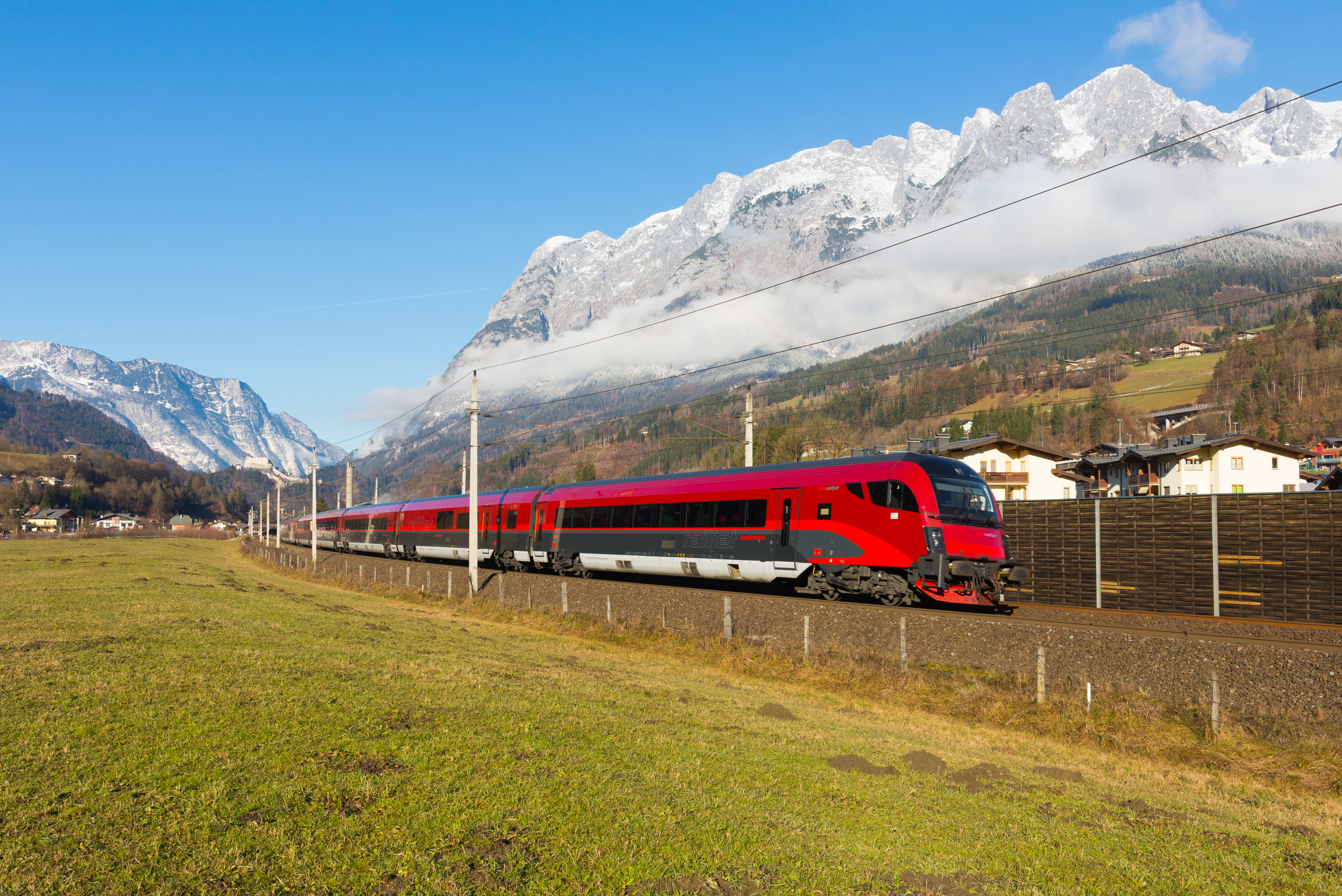
ÖBB Railjet train near Pfarrwerfen on Salzburg-Tyrol Railway

German and Austrian ICE trains operate at a maximum speed of 230 km/h (145 mph), as do Austrian locomotive-hauled trains (called Railjet) which were launched in 2008. The section between Attnang-Puchheim and Salzburg has not been part of the massive investments during the past decades. Therefore a new high-speed rail line between Köstendorf and Salzburg is being planned by ÖBB. Long distance and freight trains are planned to run through a 21.3 km (13.2 mi) long new track that is designed for a maximum speed of 250 km/h (155 mph). This new infrastructure should enable to substantially increase the number of regional trains on the existing tracks and cut travel times for long distance connections by using the new tunnels. Construction works are expected to begin in 2025/2026.

The 56 km (35 mi) Brenner Base Tunnel under construction will allow speeds of up to 250 km/h (155 mph). The expected year of completion is 2032. The first part of the New Lower Inn Valley Railway was opened in December 2012 as part of an upgrade of the line connecting the future Brenner Base Tunnel and southern Germany, which is being upgraded from two tracks to four and to a maximum design speed of 250 km/h (155 mph). The section is also part of the Berlin-Palermo railway axis.

The Koralmbahn, the first entirely new railway line in the Second Austrian Republic has been under construction since 2006. It includes a new 33 km (21 mi) tunnel (the Koralmtunnel) connecting the cities of Klagenfurt and Graz. Primarily built for intermodal freight transport, it is also used by passenger trains travelling at up to 250 km/h (155 mph). The travel time between Klagenfurt and Graz is reduced from three hours to 41 minutes. The Koralmbahn went into operation in December 2025. Another important project on the Southern Railway is the Semmering Base Tunnel. The new tunnel connects the states of Lower Austria and Styria and allows massive travel time reductions compared to the existing Semmering railway. The new base tunnel will become operational in 2029.

== Network ==
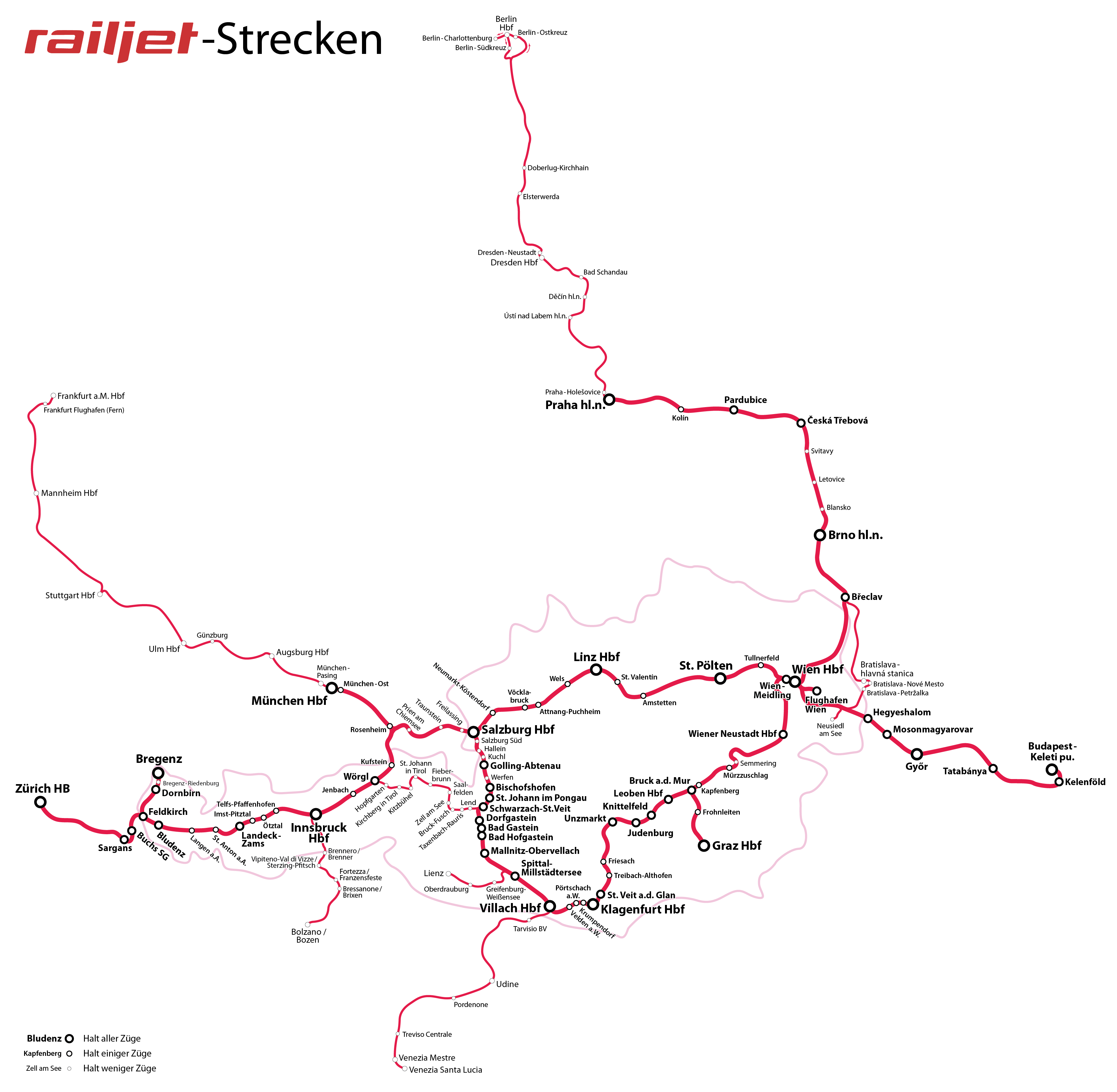
Railjet routes as of June 2020

Detail from the map of Europe's high-speed rail lines, showing the Austrian high-speed rail network (colored) and maximum speeds.
Max operational speed 310-320 km/h
Max operational speed 270-300 km/h
Max operational speed 240-260 km/h
Max operational speed 200-230 km/h
Under construction for max operational speed ≥ 200 km/h
Max operational speed < 200 km/h

Line	Maximum speed	Length	Construction began	Service started
Western Railway (Vienna - Attnang-Puchheim)	200/230 km/h (per sections)	243 km (151 mi)	Unknown (past)	1990 (Linz - Wels) to 2016 (Ybbs - Amstetten)
New Lower Inn Valley railway (Kundl - Baumkirchen)	220 km/h	40.236 km (25.001 mi)	Unknown (past)	9 December 2012
Marchegger Eastern railway (upgrade Vienna Stadlau - Slovakian border)	200 km/h	38 km	Unknown (past)	2025 (expected)
Pottendorfer line (upgrade & new Vienna Inzersdorf Ort - Wr. Neustadt)	200 km/h	47 km	Unknown (past)	2024 (expected)
Koralm Railway (Graz - Klagenfurt)	250 km/h	125 km (78 mi)	2001	14 December 2025
Semmering Base Tunnel (Gloggnitz - Mürzzuschlag)	230 km/h	27.3 km (17.0 mi)	2012	2030 (expected)
Brenner Base Tunnel & its Austrian access (Volders-Baumkirchen - Italian border)	250 km/h	46 km	Summer 2006	2032 (expected)
North Railway (upgrade Gänserndorf - Břeclav, Czech Republic)	200 km/h	47 km	2024 (expected)	2030 (expected)
Western Railway (new line Köstendorf - Salzburg)	250 km/h	21.3 km (13.2 mi)	2025/2026 (expected)	2040 (expected)
New Lower Inn Valley railway (Kundl - Brannenburg, Germany)	230 km/h	25 km (16 mi)	Unknown (future)	Unknown (future)

== See also ==
- High-speed rail in Europe
- High-speed rail in Switzerland
- High-speed rail in Germany
- High-speed rail in Italy
- Rail transport in Austria
