= High-speed rail in Switzerland =

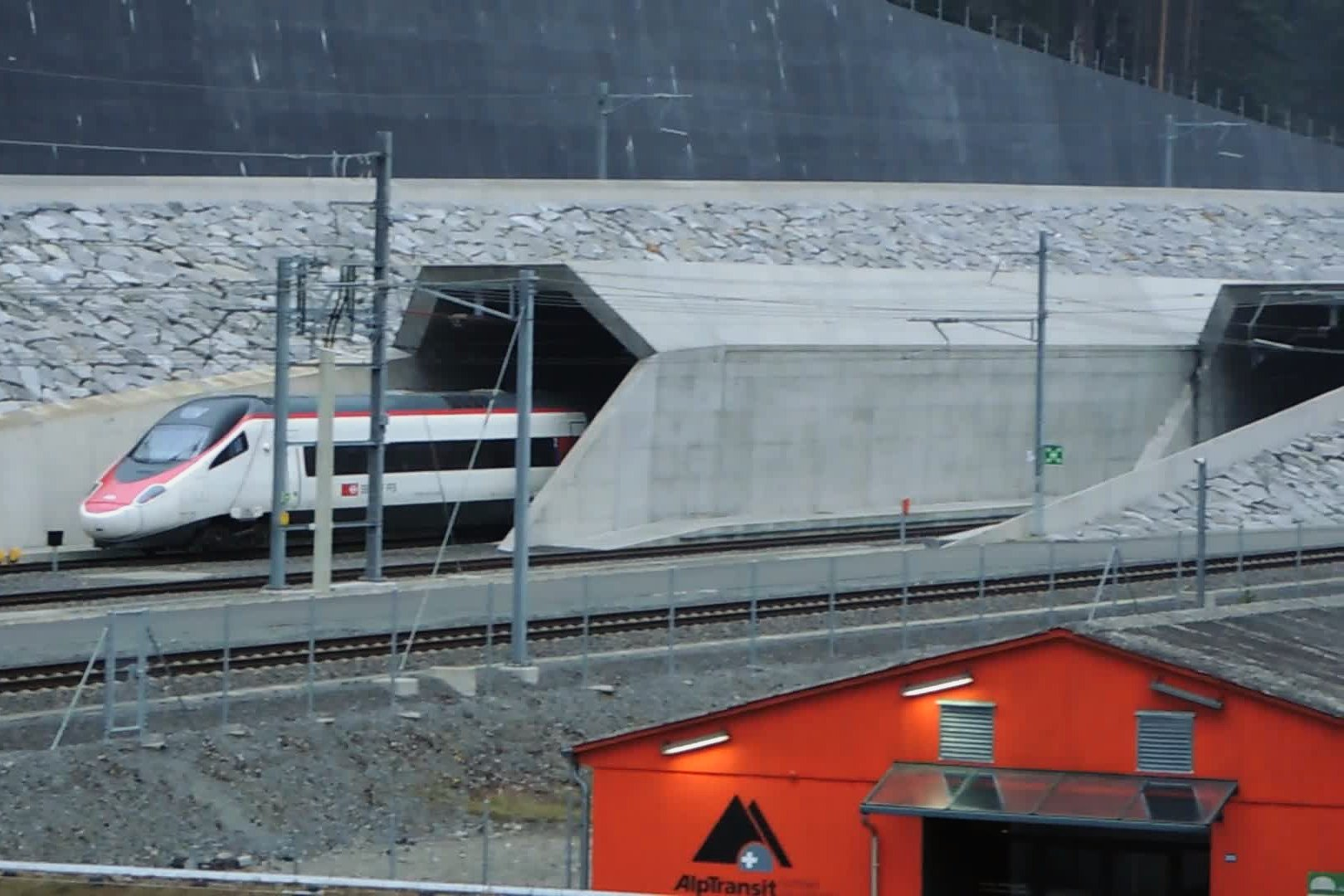
SBB EuroCity entering the Gotthard Base Tunnel

High-speed rail in Switzerland consists of two new lines and three new base tunnels, including the world's longest railway and deepest traffic tunnel: the Gotthard Base Tunnel whose length is 57 km (35 mi). Each of these tunnels have a technical maximum speed of 250 km/h (155 mph), which is reduced, at least in the Gotthard Base Tunnel and the Ceneri Base Tunnel, to a maximum authorized speed of 230 km/h (145 mph), for environmental and economic reasons.

The normal operating speed of passenger trains is limited to 200 km/h (125 mph), in order to accommodate freight traffic, but in case of delays, speeds up to 230 km/h (145 mph) are possible.

== History ==
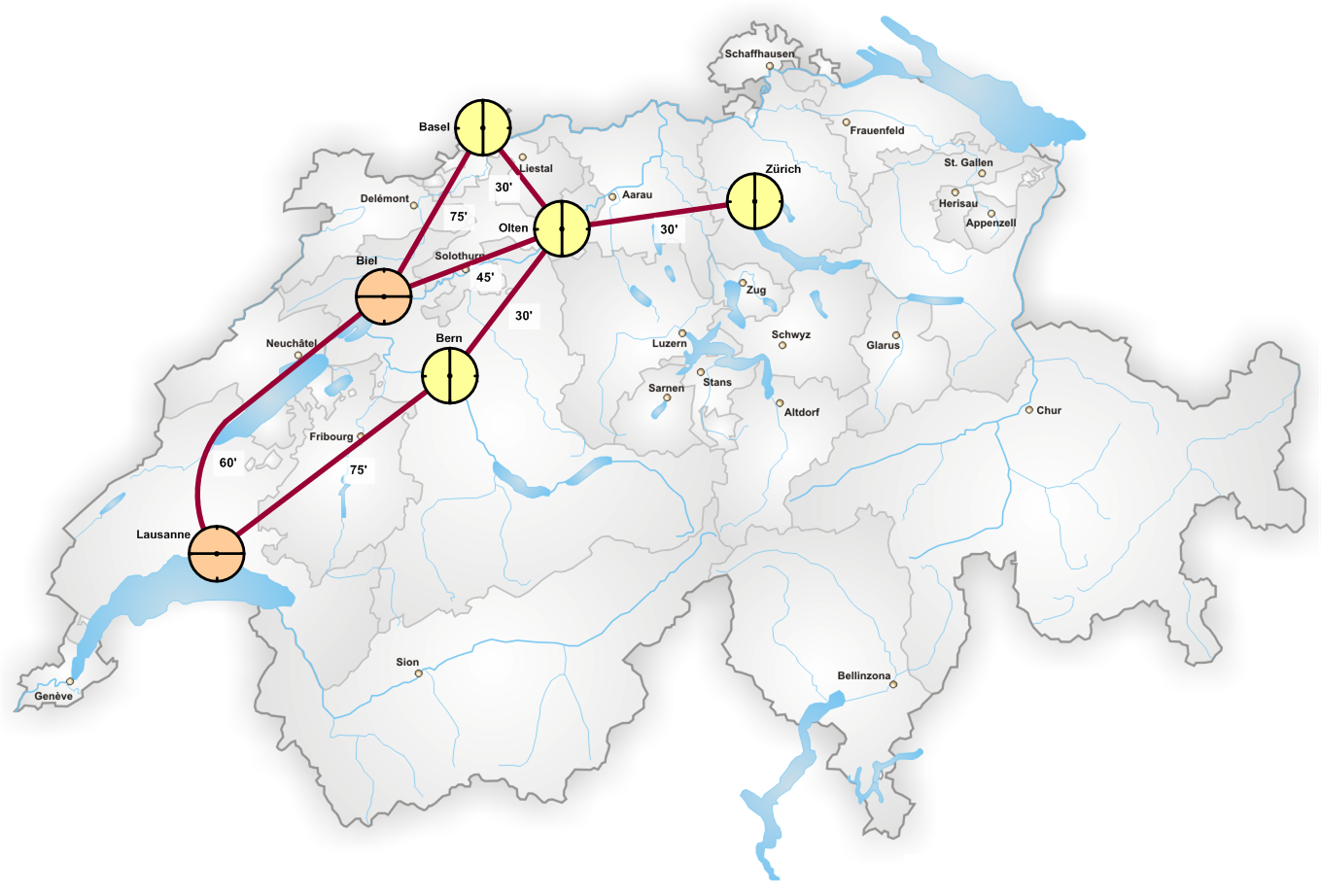
Nodal points of Rail 2000

=== Rail 2000 ===
In 1982, the Swiss government, in an effort to increase the effectiveness of their recently introduced regular interval time table, planned and executed the Rail 2000 project in 1987. The first stage of the Rail 2000 project, a route connecting Mattstetten and Rothrist, finished in December of 2004. After the projects completion, the majority of Swiss citizens felt as if their needs were met.

The second stage of Rail 2000, still in project, includes line upgrades in the Valais canton (200 km/h (125 mph)) and between Biel and Solothurn (also 200 km/h (125 mph)).

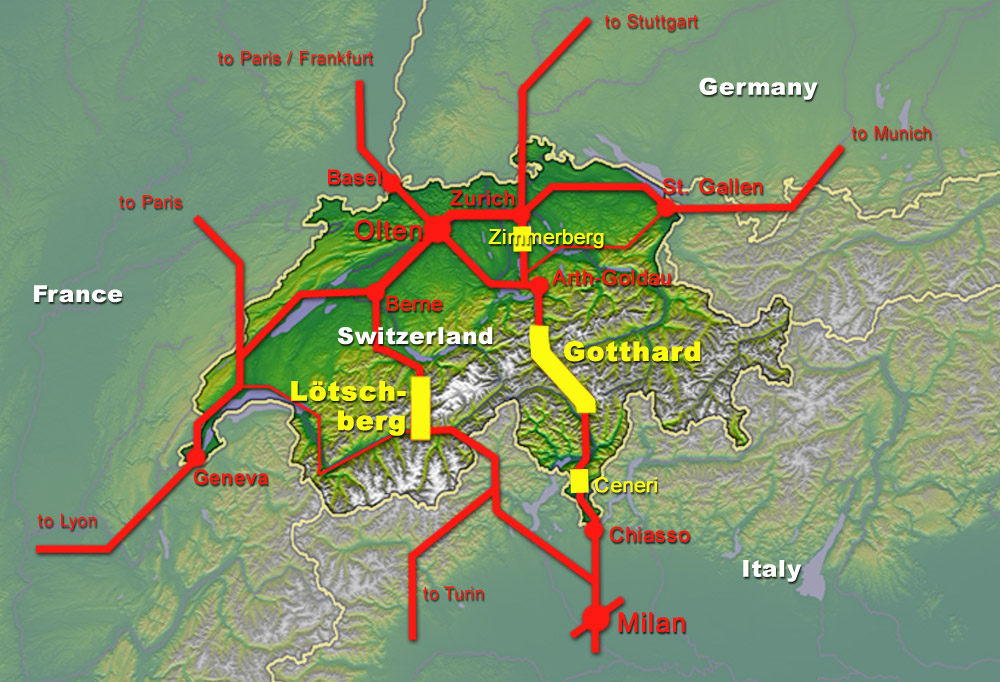
The NRLA project is the centerpiece of the Central European rail network.

=== NRLA project ===
New Railway Link through the Alps (NRLA; German: Neue Eisenbahn-Alpentransversale, NEAT, French: nouvelle ligne ferroviaire à travers les Alpes, NLFA, Italian: Nuova ferrovia transalpina, NFTA), is a Swiss construction project for faster north-south rail links across the Swiss Alps. It includes three completed base tunnels several hundred metres below the existing apex tunnels, the 57-kilometre (35 mi) Gotthard Base Tunnel, the 35-kilometre (22 mi) Lötschberg Base Tunnel, and the 15-kilometre (9.3 mi) Ceneri Base Tunnel. The NRLA also includes the Zimmerberg Base Tunnel for which only Phase I has been completed, in 2003, with an operating speed of 160 km/h (100 mph), and Phase II remains in project.

NRLA project is building faster north-south tracks across the Swiss Alps by constructing base tunnels several hundred metres below the level of the current tunnels. The 35 km (22 mi) Lötschberg Base Tunnel opened in 2007 where New Pendolino trains run. The 57 km (35 mi) Gotthard Base Tunnel opened on 1 June 2016. The 15 km (9.3 mi) Ceneri Base Tunnel opened on 4 September 2020.

However, the slow speed of lines between the NRLA tunnels (Ceneri Base Tunnel, Gotthard Base Tunnel and Zimmerberg Base Tunnel to name but a few) means that the capacity of Zürich-Milan services will remain limited until the speeds can be increased, given the strong negative effect of mixed rail speeds on capacity.

== Rolling stock ==
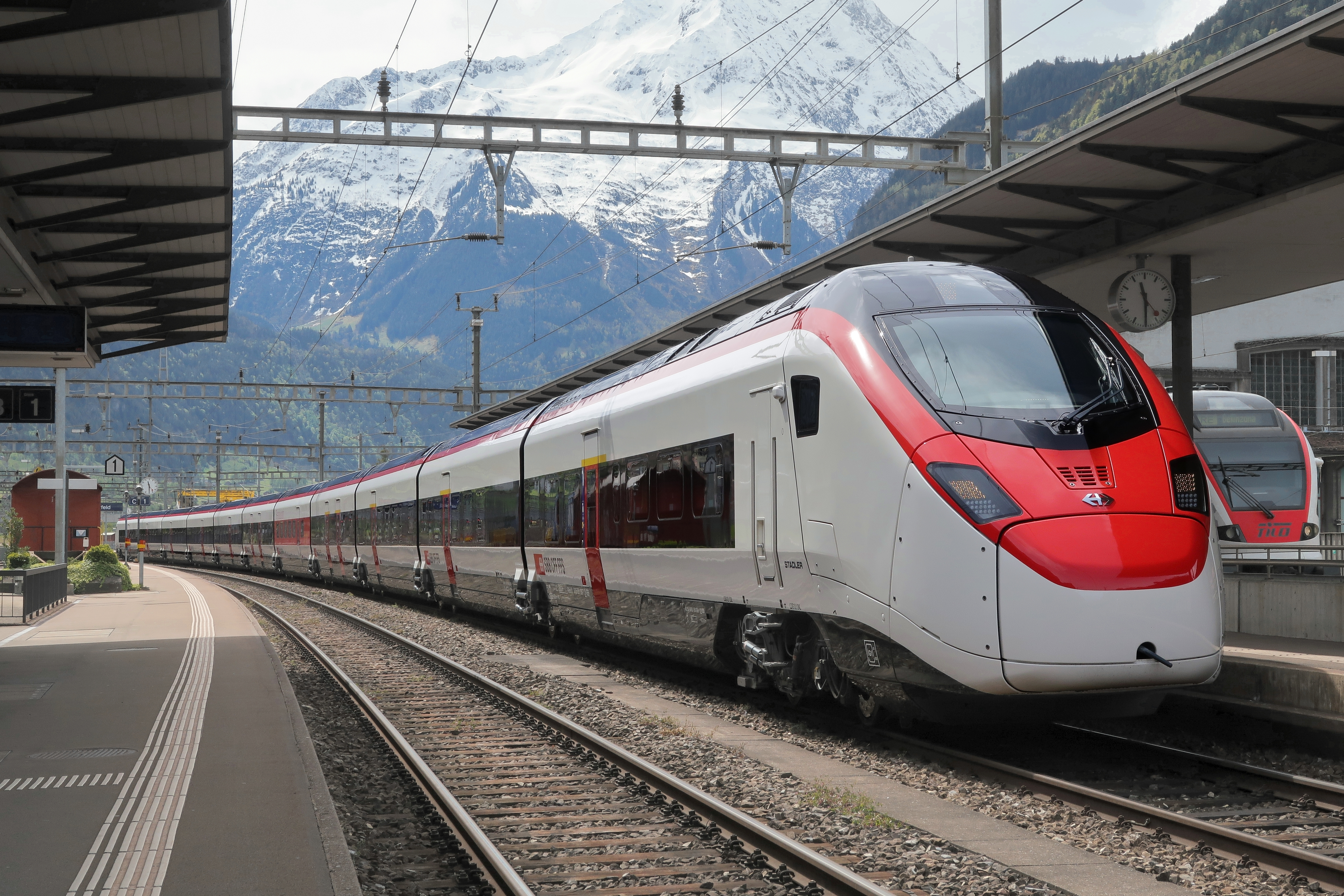
An 11-coach, 202 m long SBB RABe 501 Giruno in Erstfeld, after its first scheduled run for SBB, May 8, 2019.

The fastest Swiss train is the SBB RABe 501, nicknamed Giruno (Romansh for Buzzard). It is operated by the Swiss Federal Railways since May 2016. It only reaches its maximum speed of 250 km/h (155 mph) in Italy, on the Swiss network it operates at a maximum of 200 km/h (125 mph).

The French-Swiss co-operation TGV Lyria and German ICE lines extend into Switzerland. The ICE 4 regularly operates at a maximum of 200 km/h (125 mph) (between Olten and Bern), while the TGV never exceeds 160 km/h (100 mph), due to the lack of a high-speed track between Basel and Zürich.

The former Cisalpino consortium owned by the Swiss Federal Railways and Trenitalia used Pendolino tilting trains on two of its international lines. These trains are now operated by the Swiss Federal Railways and Trenitalia.

== Network ==
Detail from the map of Europe's high-speed rail lines, showing the Swiss high-speed rail network (colored) and maximum speeds.
Max operational speed 310-320 km/h
Max operational speed 270-300 km/h
Max operational speed 240-260 km/h
Max operational speed 200-230 km/h
Under construction for max operational speed ≥ 200 km/h
Max operational speed < 200 km/h

Line	Max speed	Operating speed (max)	Length	Construction began	Construction completed or start of revenue services
Mattstetten–Rothrist new line	200 km/h (125 mph)	200 km/h (125 mph)	45 km	1996	2004
Solothurn-Wanzwil new line	Per section: 200 km/h (125 mph); or 140 km/h (87 mph)	Per section: 200 km/h (125 mph); or 140 km/h (87 mph)	12 km	?	2004
Lötschberg Base Tunnel	250 km/h (155 mph)	200 km/h (125 mph)	35 km	1994	2007
Gotthard Base Tunnel	Technical: 250 km/h (155 mph); Authorized: 230 km/h (145 mph)	Normal: 200 km/h (125 mph); If delay: 230 km/h (145 mph)	57 km	1999	2016
Ceneri Base Tunnel	Technical: 250 km/h (155 mph); Authorized: 230 km/h (145 mph)	Normal: 200 km/h (125 mph); If delay: 230 km/h (145 mph)	15 km	2006	2020

== See also ==
- High-speed rail in Europe
- High-speed rail in Germany
- High-speed rail in Austria
- High-speed rail in France
- High-speed rail in Italy
- Rail transport in Switzerland
- History of rail transport in Switzerland
