= Southern Railway (Austria) =

Railway in Austria

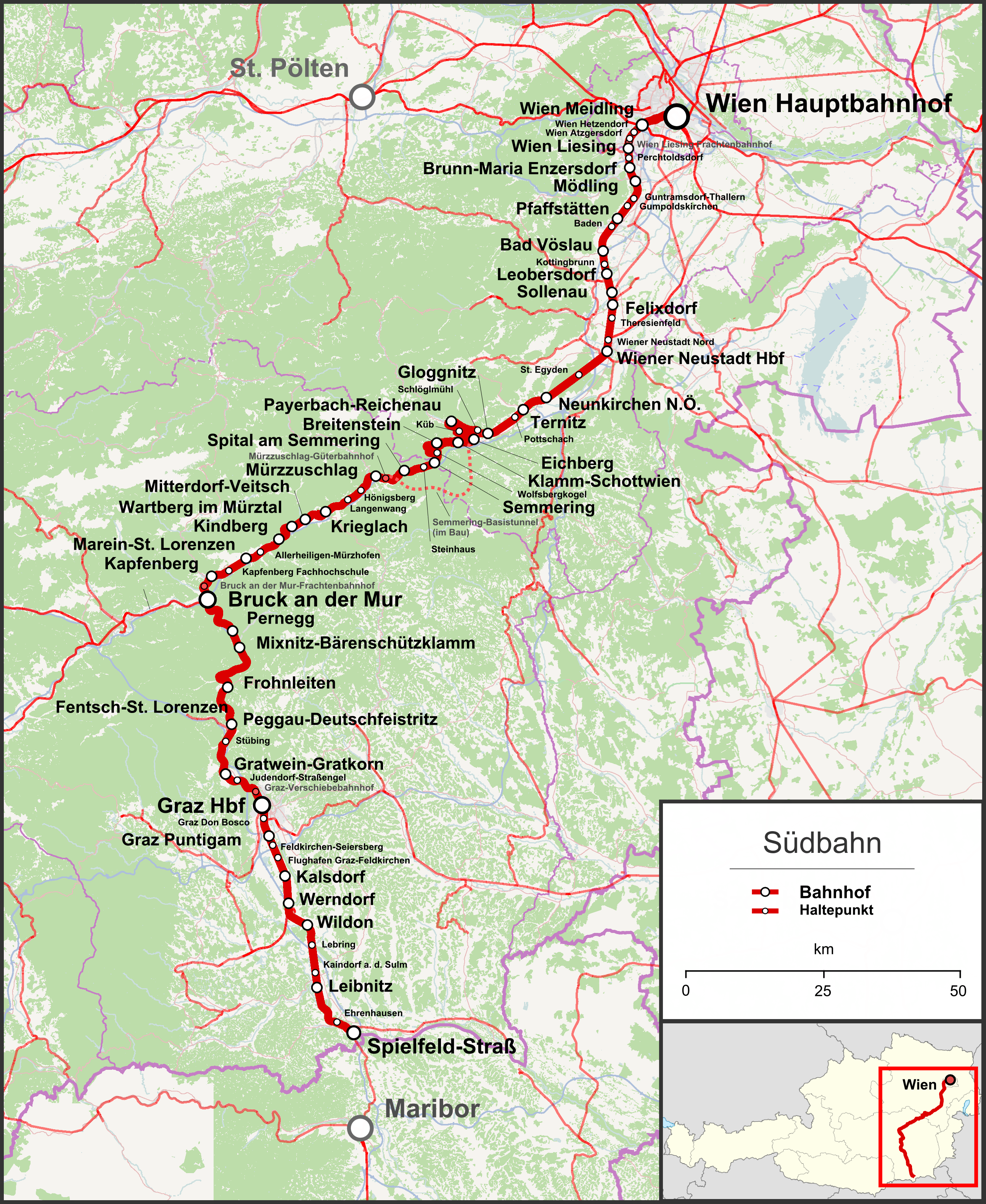

Overview
- Native name: Südbahn (Österreich)
- Status: Operational
- Owner: Austrian Federal Railways
- Line number: 105 01
- Locale: Vienna; Lower Austria; Styria
- Termini: Wien Hauptbahnhof; Border of Austria–Slovenia
- Stations: 82

Service
- Type: Heavy rail, Passenger/Freight rail Intercity rail, Regional rail, Commuter rail
- Route number: 500 (Wien Hbf – Mürzzuschlag) 501 (Wien Hbf – Graz); 502 (Graz – Maribor/Bad Radkersdburg); 510 (Wien Hbf – Payerbach-Reichenau); 524 (Wien Meidling – Deutschkreutz); 600 (Wien Hbf – Tarvisio) 900 (Wien S-Bahn)
- Operator(s): Austrian Federal Railways

History
- Opened: Stages between 1841–1848

Technical
- Line length: 259.7 km (161.4 mi)
- Number of tracks: Double track • Wien Hbf – Werndorf, Lebring – Leibnitz; Single track
- Track gauge: 1,435 mm (4 ft 8 1/2 in) standard gauge
- Minimum radius: 171 m
- Electrification: 15 kV 16.7 Hz AC
- Operating speed: 160 km/h (99 mph)
- Maximum incline: 2.81 %

The Southern Railway (German: Südbahn) is a railway in Austria that runs from Vienna to Graz and the border with Slovenia at Spielfeld via Semmering and Bruck an der Mur. Along with the Spielfeld-Straß–Trieste railway (lying largely in Slovenia), it forms part of the Austrian Southern Railway that connected Vienna with Trieste, the main seaport of the Austro-Hungarian Monarchy, via Ljubljana. A main obstacle in its construction was getting over the Semmering Pass over the Northern Limestone Alps. The twin-track, electrified section that runs through the current territory of Austria is owned and operated by Austrian Federal Railways (ÖBB) and is one of the major lines in the country.

== History ==
- 1829: Austrian railway pioneer Franz Xaver Riepl proposed a railway connection from Vienna to the Adriatic Sea, bypassing the Eastern Alps and running via Bruck an der Leitha, Magyaróvár and Szombathely (through the west edge of Hungary, avoiding the Alps), and then Maribor and Ljubljana to Trieste. His plans were adopted by entrepreneur Georgios Sinas. At the same time plans for a direct connection through the Alps were developed and promoted by Archduke John of Austria to open up the Styrian lands beyond Semmering Pass.
- 1836: Sinas had engineer Matthias von Schönerer build the first stretch of line from Vienna to Győr (Raab), Hungary with a branch-off to Bratislava.

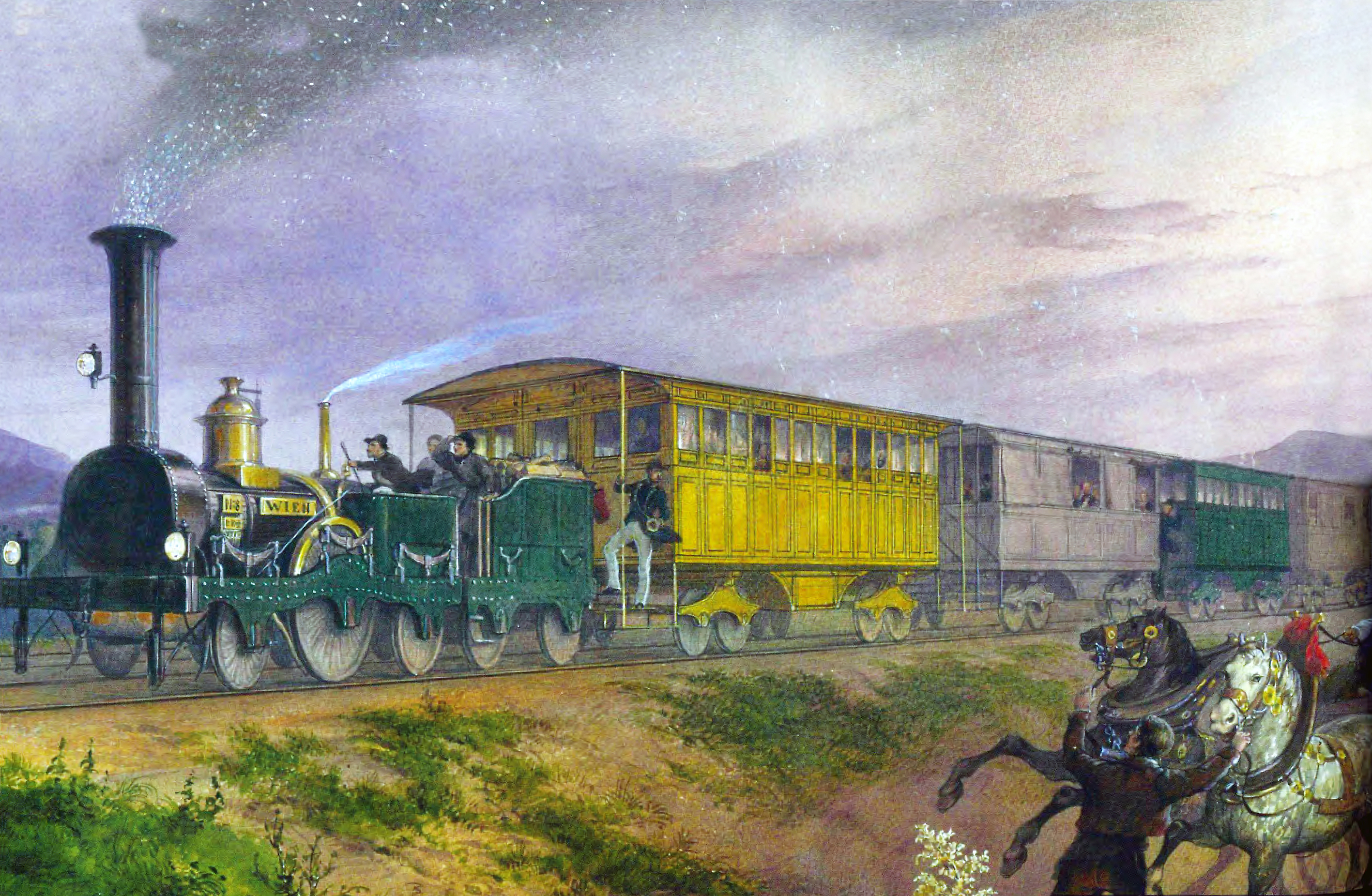
Südbahn train near Baden, 1847

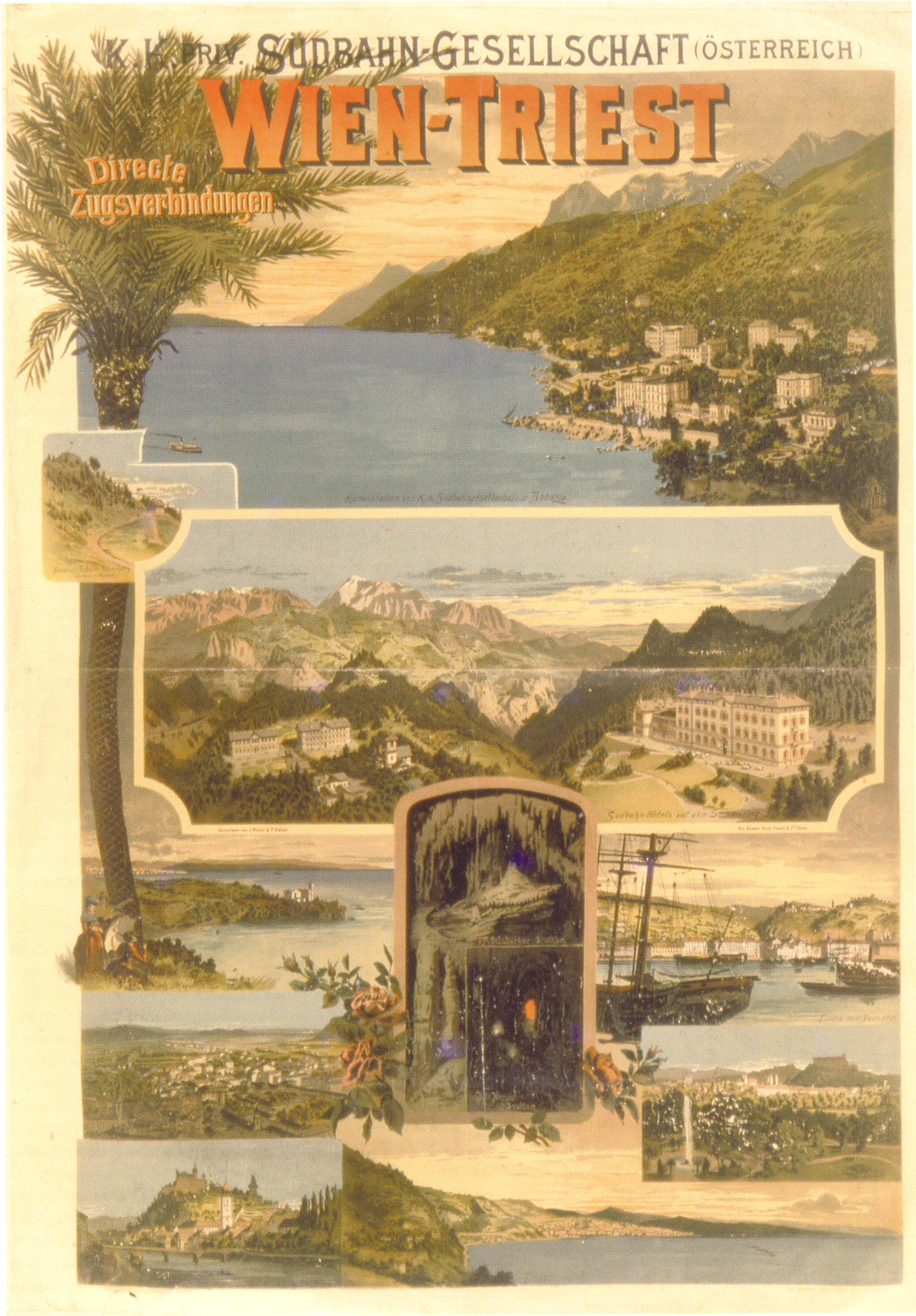
Südbahn poster, 1898

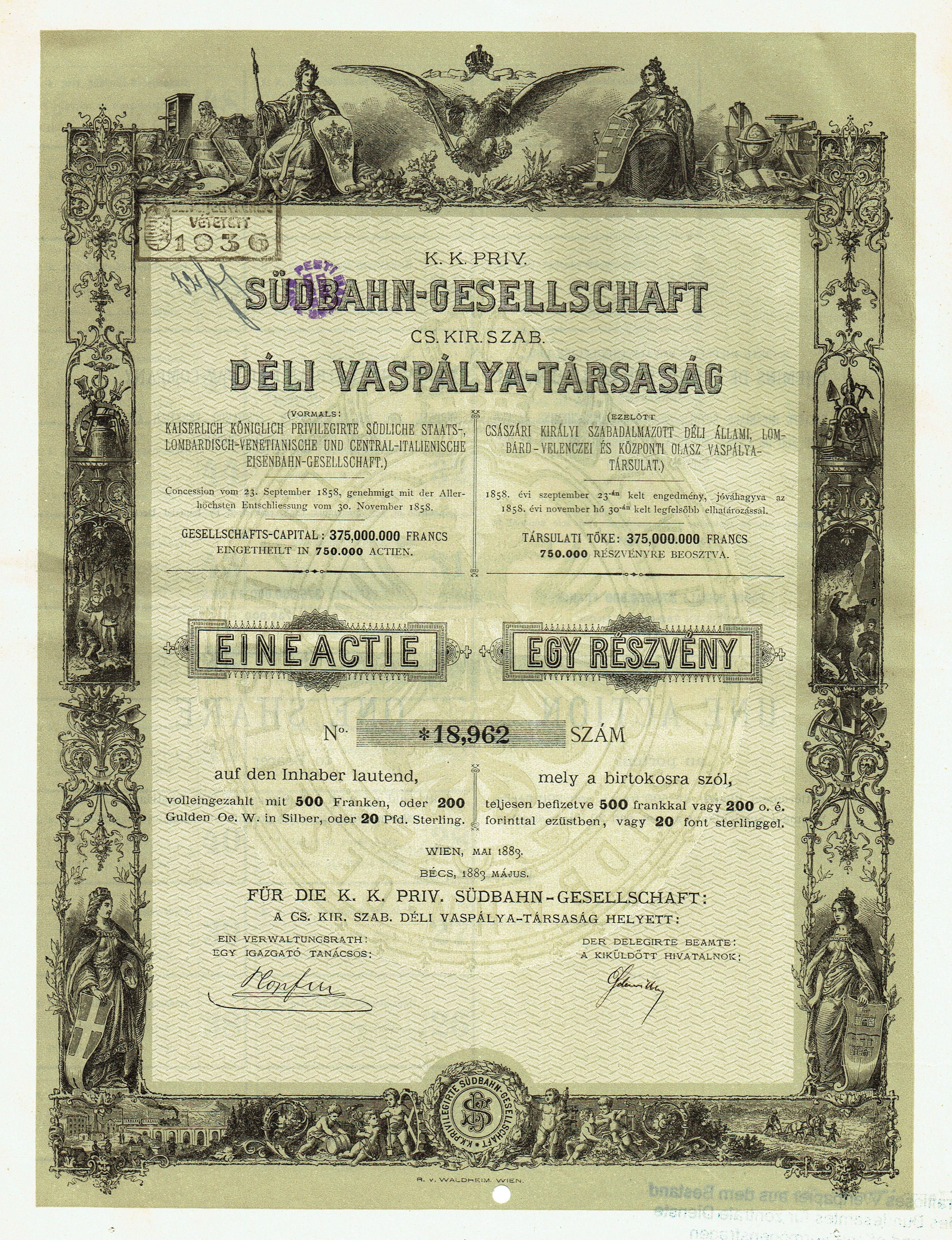
Share of the Südbahn-Gesellschaft, issued May 1883

- 1838: Sinas established the private Wien-Raaber Eisenbahn (WRB) company with 12.5 million florins of share capital.
- 1839: Departing from the original plans of a connection via Hungary, construction works started on the initial section which ran southwards between Baden, Lower Austria and Wiener Neustadt. Schönerer had travelled to the US, where he bought a used steam locomotive named Philadelphia, built by the Norris Locomotive Works in 1837.
- 16 May 1841. This section opened. Soon after, the railway was extended to Mödling and Neunkirchen.
- 1841: Ghega started to survey the terrain of the Semmering Pass.
- 5 May 1842: The line from Wien Südbahnhof (Southern Station) was completed to Gloggnitz at the northern foot of the Semmering Pass. Most goods traffic ran on the parallel Wiener Neustadt Canal (also leased by Sinas), but passenger figures continuously increased.
- 1844: Sinas had the construction of the railway to Hungary (the present-day Eastern Railway) resumed.
- 21 October 1844: South of the Semmering Pass, the line from Graz northward to Mürzzuschlag (decided on by the Austrian government) (led by engineer Carl Ritter von Ghega) opened.
- 2 June 1846: The southern continuation to Celje was inaugurated.
- March 1848: The Revolutions of 1848 in the Austrian Empire started.
- 1849: Extended to Ljubljana. Passengers still had to use the stagecoach across the Semmering Pass
- 1853: The k.k. Südliche Staatsbahn nationalised the Vienna–Gloggnitz line.
- 1848 to 1854: The section over the Semmering Pass was built.
- 17 July 1854: The direct railway connection from Vienna to Ljubljana was inaugurated.
- 1854 to 1857: The final section across the Karst Plateau was built.
- 12 July 1857: The first through train from Vienna to Trieste ran.
- 23 May 1858: The railway was sold to the newly established Austrian Southern Railway stock company.
- 1 June 1859: The last section of the North Italy extension was finished near Magenta, Lombardy.
- 4 June 1859: The Austrian Army was defeated at the Battle of Magenta.
- 1859: In the Second Italian War of Independence Austria lost Lombardy and with it the Lombardy section of the Southern Railway.
- 1860: The connection to Milan was opened.
- 1866: The Peace of Prague ended the Third Italian War of Independence. Austria lost Venetia and with it the Venetia section of the Southern Railway.

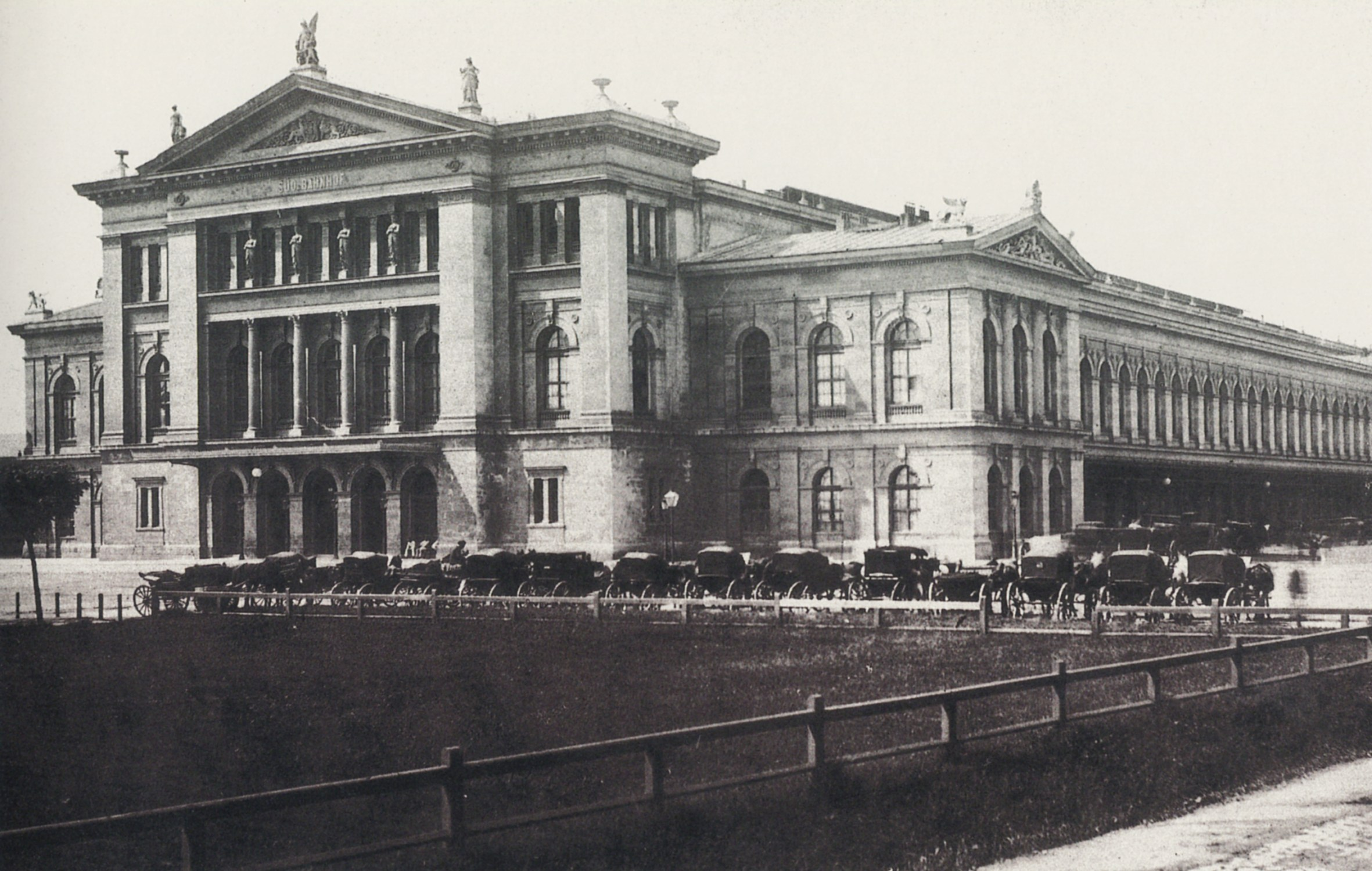
Wien Südbahnhof, built in 1875

- 1919 Treaty of Saint-Germain. Dissolution of Austria-Hungary after World War I. Austria lost all the Southern Railway south of the station at Spielfeld, Styria, which became a border station to Šentilj in the Kingdom of Serbs, Croats and Slovenes (Kingdom of Yugoslavia from 1929, present-day Slovenia).
- 1923: The Austrian Federal Railways took over.
- 1945 and after: During the Cold War trade between Vienna and Trieste was mainly run through Tarvisio.
- 1963: By now the tracks from Vienna through Tarvisio to Trieste had been electrified.
- 1966: By now the tracks from Vienna to Graz and Yugoslavia had been electrified.
- 2007: Border controls were abolished with Slovenia's accession to the Schengen Area.
- 12 September 2007: A very high value collectors' coin (the Austrian Southern Railways Vienna-Triest commemorative coin) was minted: its obverse shows the locomotive "Steinbrück" with one of the typical viaducts of the Semmering Railway in the background. The engine “Steinbrück” can be seen today in the Technical Museum in Vienna. It is the oldest existing locomotive built in Austria; it was built in 1848 for the Southern Railway.

=== Upgrading ===
The railway is currently being upgraded with the Semmering Base Tunnel scheduled to be opened in 2030 as well as the new Koralm Railway branch-off to Klagenfurt, Carinthia scheduled to fully open in 2025, in total cutting travel time between Graz and Klagenfurt to 45 minutes from 3 hours and travel time between Vienna and Klagenfurt down to 2 hours and 40 minutes. The section Meidling-Mödling is being upgraded to quadruple-track railway to facilitate more trains.

The section from Graz to the Slovenian border, which had been downgraded to a single track railway in the 1950s, is currently again enlarged to double track.

== Train service ==
There are ÖBB Railjet high-speed trains operating between Vienna and Graz.

Within the Vienna metropolitan region, the sections between new Vienna Central Station, Wien Meidling, Mödling, Leobersdorf and Wiener Neustadt Hauptbahnhof are part of the suburban Vienna S-Bahn railway network.
