= Semmering =

Semmering may refer to:

- Semmering (ski resort)
- Semmering, Austria
- Semmering Pass
- Semmering railway
