= Koralm Railway =

Key Graz-Klagenfurt transport link

Coordinates: 46°45′34″N 15°00′51″E

Koralm Railway Koralmbahn
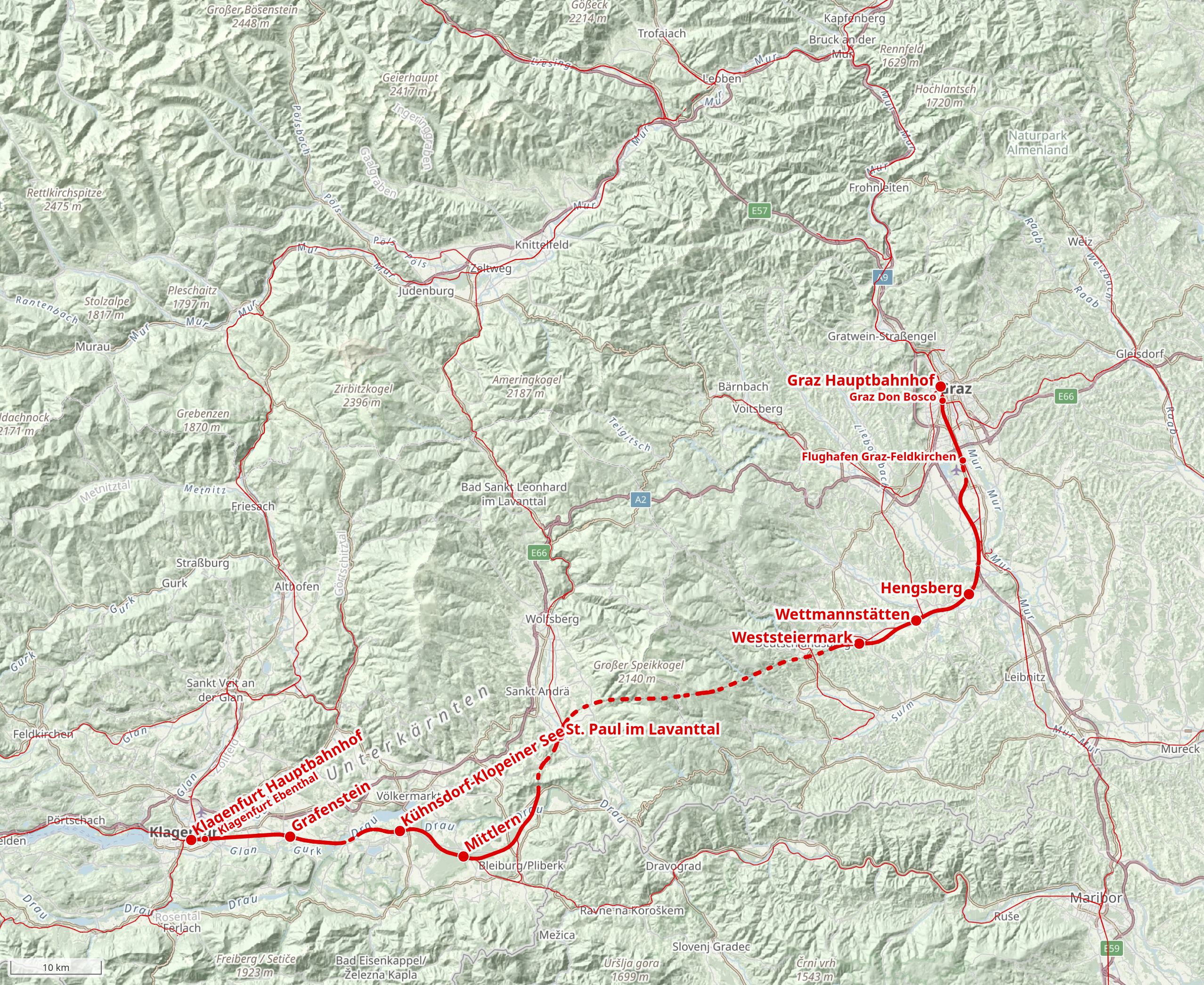
- Track of the Koralm Railway

Overview
- Status: Operational
- Locale: Austria (Styria, Carinthia)
- Termini: Graz Central Station; Klagenfurt Central Station
- Stations: 12
- Website: Koralm Railway (in German)

Service
- Type: High-speed rail Commuter rail Freight rail

History
- Work began: 1999
- Opened: 14 December 2025

Technical
- Line length: 127 km (79 mi)
- Number of tracks: 2
- Track gauge: 1,435 mm (4 ft 8 1/2 in) standard gauge
- Minimum radius: 3,000 metres (9,800 ft)
- Operating speed: 250 km/h (155 mph)
- Maximum incline: 8‰

The Koralm Railway (German: Koralmbahn) is an Austrian 127 km-long (79 mi) double-track, electrified, high-speed railway connecting the cities of Graz and Klagenfurt. Construction started in 1999; the entire railway line was opened on 14 December 2025.

== Overview ==
The railway is primarily built for intermodal freight transport but will also be used by passenger trains travelling at up to 250 km/h. The travel time from Klagenfurt to Graz will be reduced from three hours to 41 minutes. Commissioning of the first new track section began in 2010, the Carinthian section was opened in December 2023. The entire railway line became operational with the yearly timetable change in December 2025.

The centrepiece of the new railway is the 33 km Koralm Tunnel under the Koralpe mountains that give the railway its name. At the time of construction the project was the largest to expand the Austrian railway network with a budget of several billion euros. It connects the federal state capitals of the adjacent states of Styria and Carinthia. The connection is possible via a three-hour train journey via Bruck an der Mur, though ÖBB has run Intercitybus services between Graz and Klagenfurt via Wolfsberg at a frequency of approximately two hours with a journey time of two hours. In combination with the projected 27 km-long Semmering Base Tunnel the Koralm Railway removes bottlenecks in the Austrian freight and passenger railway infrastructure (namely the Semmering Pass and the Neumarkt Sattel). Together with the existing Italian Pontebbana railway line between Tarvisio and Udine they will be part of what is referred to as Baltic–Adriatic Corridor—a traffic axis connecting the Polish port city of Gdańsk and the Italian city of Bologna. In 2013 the Koralm Railway was integrated into the Trans-European Transport Core Network.

Up until the inauguration of the Koralmbahn, the fastest Vienna-Graz and Vienna-Klagenfurt journeys on the Railjet services were 2h35m and 3h55m, respectively. If the Koralm railway enables Graz-Klagenfurt journeys of 41 minutes, this will bring Vienna-Klagenfurt journeys down to 3h10m, a saving of 45 minutes. In conjunction with the Semmering Base Tunnel (expected to offer journey time savings of approximately 30 minutes) and the upgraded Pottendorfer Line (de:Pottendorfer Linie), Vienna-Klagenfurt journeys of 2h40m will be possible. The former railway layout made it difficult for services to and from Vienna to simultaneously serve both Graz and Klagenfurt (the biggest cities in the Styria and Carinthia Länder respectively). Unless trains backtrack to Bruck an der Mur, the shortest railway route between the two cities runs via Maribor, Slovenia. As a result, ÖBB served Graz and Klagenfurt with separate Railjet services. The Koralm Railway makes it significantly easier for ÖBB to connect both cities to Vienna with the same Railjet services, making increased service frequencies for these two cities possible.

== Sections ==
=== Graz - Feldkirchen ===
Between Graz and Feldkirchen the Koralm Railway meets the Southern Railway line (Südbahn) connecting Vienna with Slovenia. This stretch was upgraded in order to meet High-speed rail and S-Bahn standards. Specifically, level crossings were replaced by undercrossings and train stations were upgraded with some of them now serving as interchanges to other transport modes. The urban tram and bus services of Graz were extended to provide direct links from the train stations Graz-Don Bosco and Graz-Puntigam to the city centre. Between 2010 and 2013 Graz central station was upgraded to meet the expected increase in railway traffic following the opening of the Koralm Railway and the extension of the Southern Railway between Graz and Slovenia from a single to a two track railway line.

Features:

- Length: 7 km
- Structures: Several undercrossings (10 new, 2 upgrade)
- Construction started: 2002
- Progress: completed

=== Feldkirchen - Wettmannstätten ===
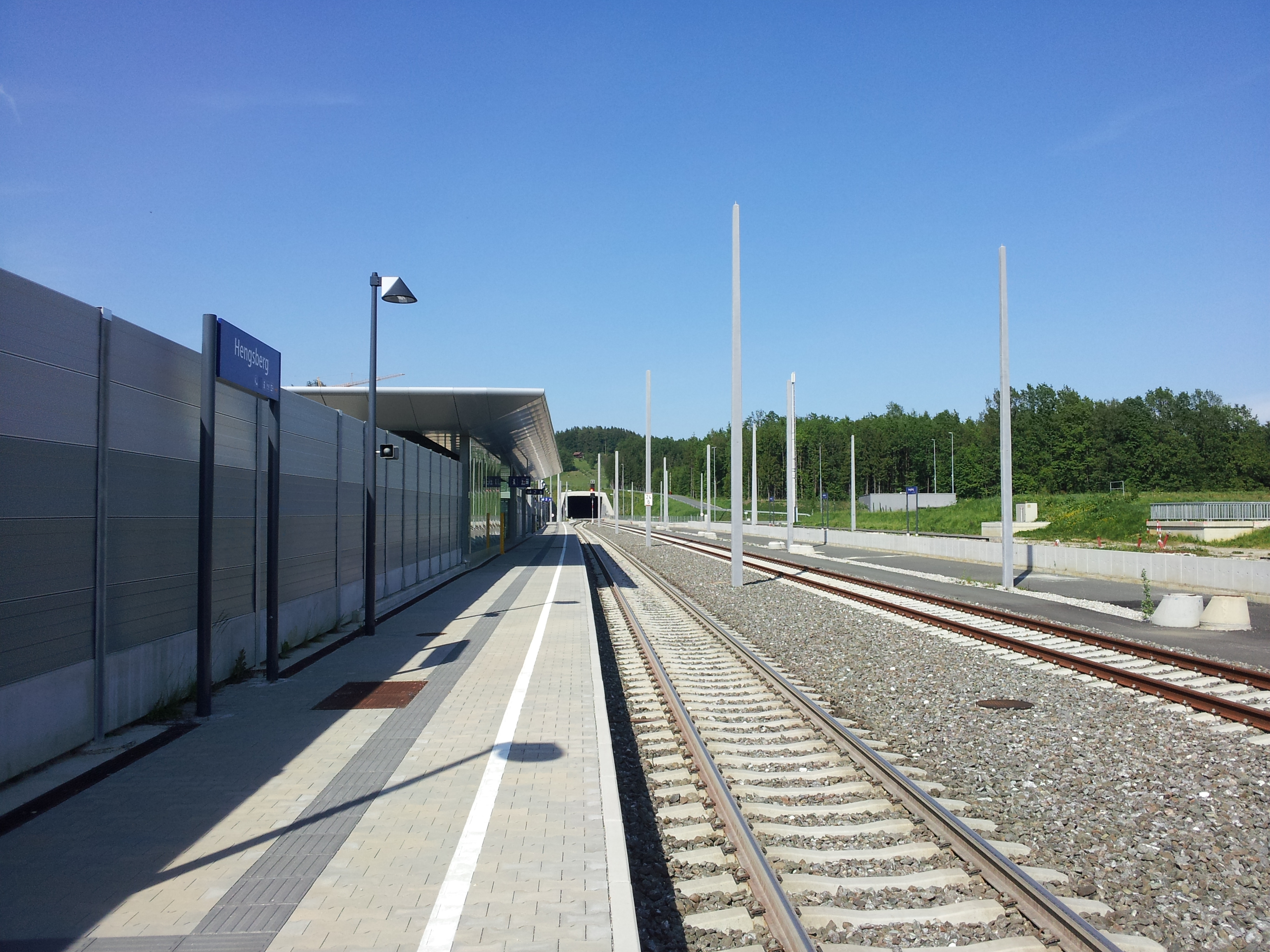
Southern portal of the Hengsbergtunnel and Hengsberg station (opened in 2010)

After crossing the Süd Autobahn (A2) the Koralm Railway branches off the existing Southern Railway tracks. Immediately after the junction a 3 km-long subsurface route will be erected which initially would also have included a station serving Graz Airport. Reemerging on the surface the tracks will then cross the Grazer Feld plain and subsequently follow the Pyhrn Autobahn (A9). South of the Container terminal Werndorf two junctions to the existing Southern Railway line will be built - the first to integrate the container terminal, the second (Weitendorf junction) will serve as a connection for local railway services. After undercrossing the Pyhrn Autobahn and going through the 1.7 km-long Hengsberg Tunnel the Koralm Railway will arrive at Wettmannstätten. In December 2010 the 14 km-long section from Weitendorf junction to Wettmannstätten was opened as a single track, non-electrified railway. It is integrated in the Styrian S-Bahn system as S6 , cutting the journey time from Deutschlandsberg to Graz main station by 15 minutes. With the start of operations on the complete Koralm Railway this stretch had been upgraded to two tracks and electrified.

Features:

- Length: 24.3 km
- Total length of subsurface sections: 5.8 km
- Structures: 2 subsurface routes, 1 tunnel, several bridges
- Construction started: 2007
- Progress: subsection Weitendorf junction-Wettmannstätten - finished

=== Wettmannstätten - Sankt Andrä ===
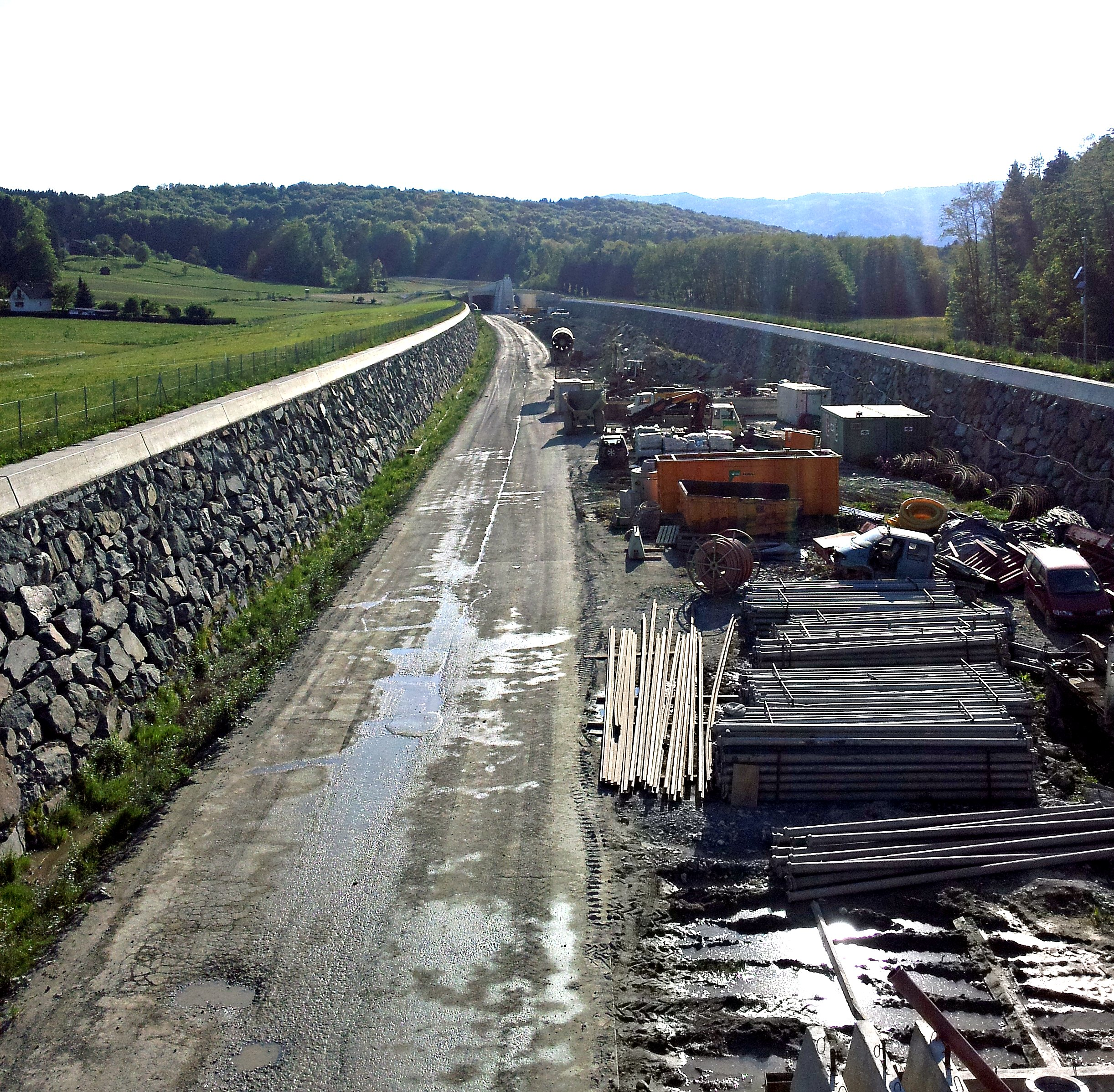
Eastern portal of the Koralm Tunnel (May 2012)

This section includes the 33 km-long Koralm Tunnel undercutting the Koralpe, an up to 2000 m high mountain range separating Southern Styria and Eastern Carinthia. Before reaching the eastern portal of the tunnel the Koralm Railway crosses the Laßnitz valley on a 10 km open land stretch, incorporating the future structures of the train station Weststeiermark. The station will serve as the regional hub connecting existing local railway lines with the Intercity traffic running over the Koralm Railway. It will also host the safety and maintenance installations of the Koralm tunnel.

The Koralm Tunnel itself will consist of two single track tubes with cross-passages every 500 m and an emergency station halfway its total length of 33 km. The construction of the tunnel is divided into three sections (from east to west): KAT1, KAT2 and KAT3. Construction of exploration tunnels started in 2003 and lasted until 2010, works on section KAT1 began in 2008 and were finished in 2013, works on the section KAT2 began in 2011, and on KAT3 in 2014.

Features:

- Length: 41.5 km
- Total length of subsurface sections: 32.9 km
- Structures: 23 bridges and undercrossings, 3 railway bridges, 1 tunnel
- Construction started: 2008
- Progress: finished

=== Sankt Andrä - Aich ===
This 9.7-kilometre-long (6.0 mi) section between the western portal of the Koralm tunnel at Sankt Andrä and Aich includes the Lavanttal station, which will serve a similar role as the Weststeiermark station on the Styrian side of the Koralm, that is, connecting the Koralm Railway with local train and bus services. After crossing the Lavanttal the Koralm Railway enters a series of tunnels (collectively called Tunnelkette Granitztal) with a total length of around 6 km (namely the Grutschentunnel, an enclosed section crossing the Granitztal valley and the Langerbergtunnel). Preparatory works started in 2008, which included the construction of bridges, highways and the diversion of a section of the Lavant river and a part of the Lavanttal railway. The construction of the tunnels began in March 2015. This section, and with it the entire Carinthian section of the Koralm Railway, was opened for local train services in December 2023.

Features:

- Length: 9.7 km
- Total length of subsurface sections: 6.1 km
- Structures: 2 tunnels, 1 enclosed section, 1 railway bridge, 2 bridges
- Construction started: 2008
- Progress: finished; opened for local train services in December 2023

=== Aich - Mittlern - Althofen an der Drau ===
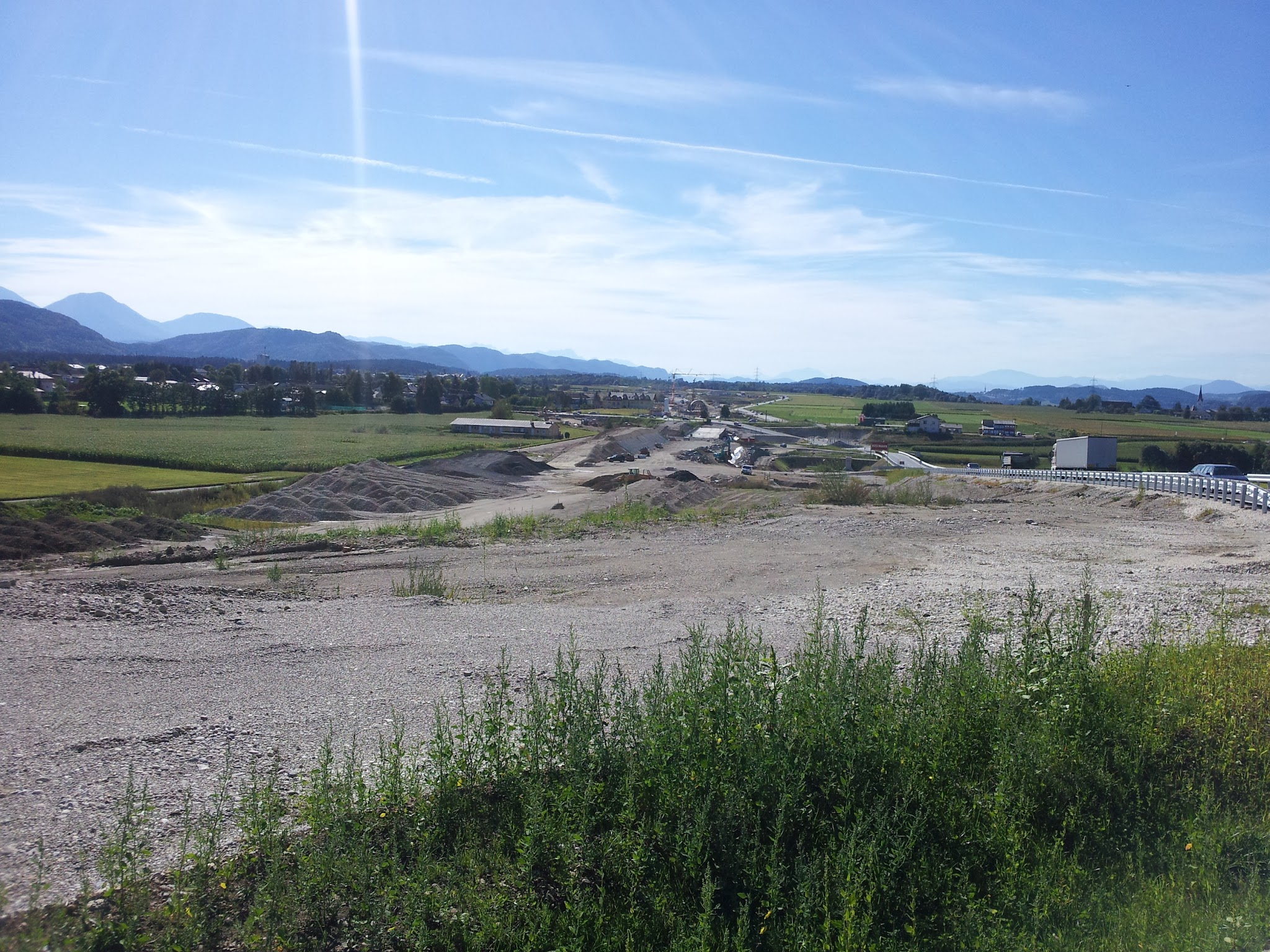
Construction site at Kühnsdorf (August 2012)

This 28.5-kilometre-long (17.7 mi) section between the Jauntal bridge and Althofen an der Drau, which includes a 600-metre-long (2,000 ft) bridge crossing the river Drau. This section, and with it the entire Carinthian section of the Koralm Railway, was opened for local train services in December 2023.

Features:

- Length: 28.5 km
- Structures: 6 tunnels, 15 railway bridges, 11 bridges, 3 undercrossings, 3 wildlife crossings
- Construction started: 2010
- Progress: finished; opened for local train services in December 2023

=== Althofen an der Drau - Klagenfurt ===
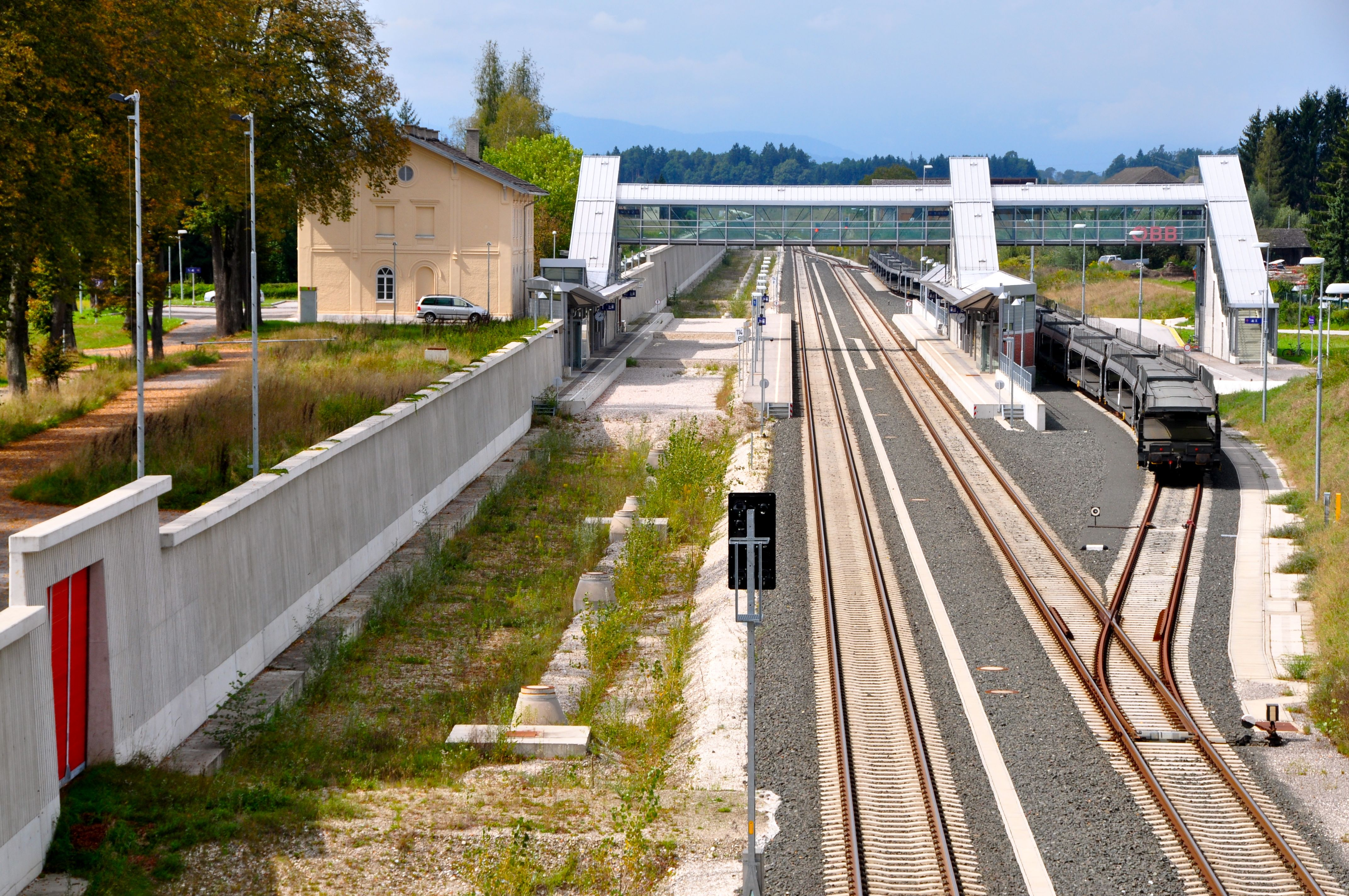
Train station Grafenstein

This 14.2-kilometre-long (8.8 mi) section between Althofen an der Drau and Klagenfurt's main station closely follows the existing regional railway line. Construction started in 2001, had to be stopped however after a legal appeal over environmental risk assessments. In 2003 works resumed and was finished in 2007 as a single track, non-electrified railway (and was upgraded to a two track, electrified railway when the whole Koralm Railway became operational). The route of this section follows entirely a section of the Drava Valley Railway (Drautalbahn), which was built in the 1860s and connected Maribor (Slovenia) to Franzensfeste (Italy).

Features:

- Length: 14.2 km
- Structures: 1 tunnel, 3 under- and overcrossings, bridges over rivers Gurk and Glan
- Construction started: 2001
- Progress: finished, opened in 2016
