= Base tunnel =

Tunnel under a mountain pass at adjoining valley floor level

Different types of tunnels. Number one shows a base tunnel

A base tunnel is a type of tunnel, mainly a railway tunnel, that is built through the base of a mountain pass. This type of tunnel typically connects two valleys at about the same altitudes.

When originally constructed, classical railway lines through mountainous terrain tried to minimize tunneling, due to technical limitations and expense, and therefore required long and steep gradients and many curves, or even spirals. Tunnels were generally short and much higher up the mountain. Such tunnels are sometimes also called culmination tunnels, especially in the presence of a base tunnel through the same mountain massif.

The base tunnels take the opposite approach, minimizing or eliminating gradients and curves with the consequence of having longer tunnels but shorter total distances to travel. This allows for higher speeds and lower energy costs.

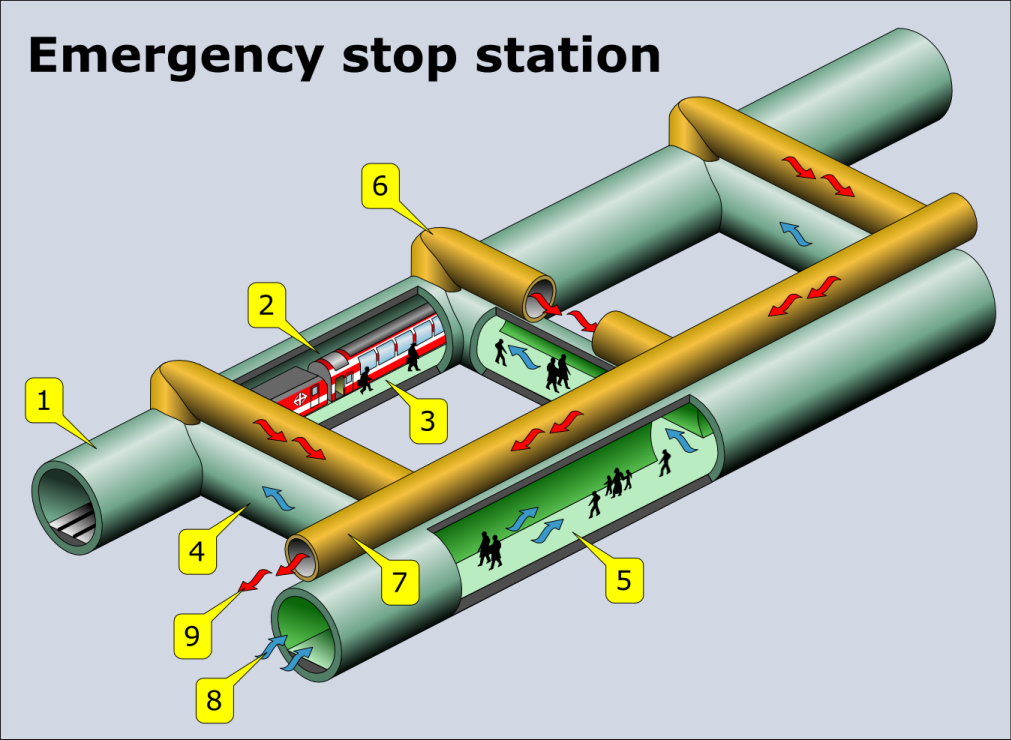
Schematic representation of a normal base tunnel construction method in Europe; they have two tubes connected every few hundred meters in order to enable evacuation in case of emergency [image shows an evacuation station of the base tunnel Gotthard, the longest railway tunnel in the world – 57 km (35 mi)]

Some of the best-known base tunnels are (with length, opening and location):

== Operational ==
- Gotthard Base Tunnel (57.1 km, 35.5 mi, 2016), Switzerland
- Lötschberg Base Tunnel (34.6 km, 21.5 mi, 2007), Switzerland
- Koralm Tunnel (32.9 km, 20.4 mi, 2025), Austria
- Pajares Base Tunnel (24.7 km, 15.3 mi, 2023), Spain
- Zimmerberg Base Tunnel (20 km, 12 mi, planned), Switzerland
- Simplon Tunnel (19.8 kilometres (12.3 mi), 1906/1921), Switzerland
- Apennine Base Tunnel (18.5 km, 11.5 mi, 1934), Italy
- Ceneri Base Tunnel (15.4 km, 9.6 mi, 2020), Switzerland
- Furka Base Tunnel (15.4 km, 9.6 mi, 1982), Switzerland

== Projected ==
- Mont d'Ambin Base Tunnel (57.5 km, 35.7 mi, proj. 2032), France and Italy
- Brenner Base Tunnel (55 km, 34 mi, proj. 2032), Austria and Italy
- Semmering Base Tunnel (27.3 km, 17.0 mi, proj. 2030), Austria
- Valico Tunnel (27 km, 17 mi, proj. 2026), Italy
- Ore Mountain Base Tunnel on the Dresden‒Prague high-speed line, Germany/Czech Republic (30.4 km (18.9 mi))
