= Dresden–Prague high-speed line =

The Dresden‒Prague high-speed line is a series of upgrades to reduce the train travel time by one hour between Dresden, Germany and Prague, Czech Republic, scheduled for construction after 2032.

The main component is a planned 30.4-kilometre-long (18.9 mi) Ore Mountains Tunnel (Erzgebirgstunnel, Krušnohorský tunel) twin-bore base tunnel running north‒south under the Ore Mountains between Heidenau station near Dresden and the town of Chabařovice near Ústí nad Labem hlavní nádraží, creating a 46-kilometre-long (29 mi) bypass to the existing Elbe Valley section of the Děčín–Dresden-Neustadt railway.

The new route forms part of the Orient/East–Med Corridor in the European Union's Trans-European Transport Network (TEN-T).
