= Semmering Base Tunnel =

Railway tunnel in southern Austria

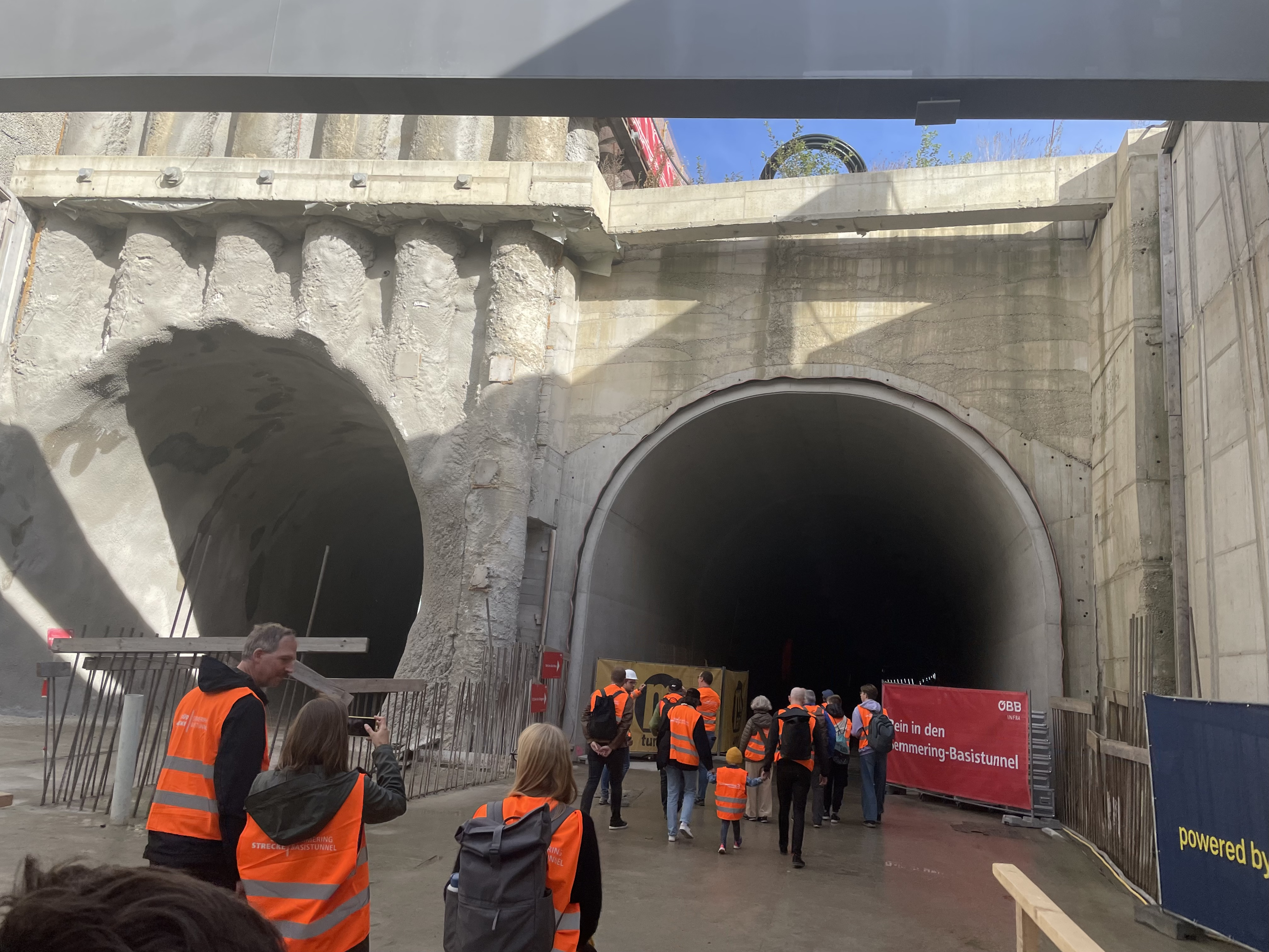
- Open day at western portal in Mürzzuschlag, October 2023

Overview
- Official name: Semmering-Basistunnel
- Location: Austria (Lower Austria, Styria)
- Coordinates: 47.6082°N 15.6901°E (west portal); 47.6772°N 15.9237°E (east portal)
- Status: Under construction
- Start: Mürzzuschlag, Styria
- End: Gloggnitz, Lower Austria

Operation
- Work began: 25 April 2012
- Opens: 2029
- Operator: ÖBB-Infrastruktur AG

Technical
- Length: 27.3 km (17.0 mi)
- No. of tracks: 2 single-track tubes
- Track gauge: 1,435 mm (4 ft 8 1/2 in) (standard gauge)
- Electrified: 15 kV 16.7 Hz AC overhead conductor rail
- Operating speed: 230 km/h (145 mph)
- Width: 10 metres (33 ft)
- Grade: 0.84% (maximum)
- Cross passages: 56

Route map
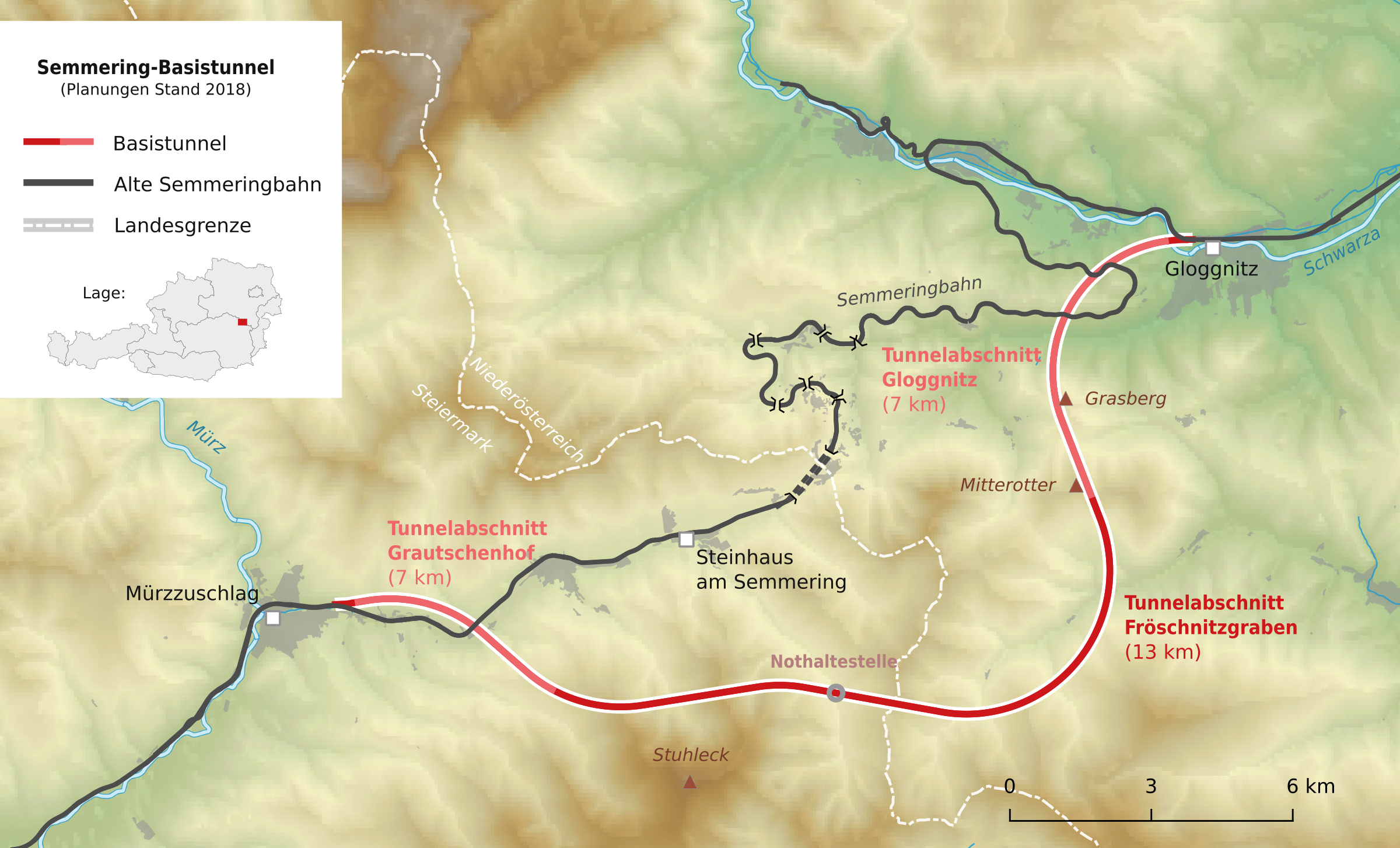
- Route map

The Semmering Base Tunnel is an under construction 27.3 km long railway tunnel underneath the Semmering Pass between Gloggnitz and Mürzzuschlag on the Southern Railway in Austria. Upon completion of the tunnel, it will replace the 41 km long Semmering Railway as the main route on this section. In addition to the reduced distance, trains will traverse the Semmering Base tunnel at up to 230 km/h compared to speed limits of 60 to 80 km/h governing most of the Semmering Railway, offering journey time savings of up to 30 minutes.

In addition to reduced travel times, the tunnel increases ease of use for freight traffic. The gradients of the Semmering Railway require the use of two locomotives; the reduced gradient of the new link will enable the transit of freight traffic using just one locomotive. The Semmering Base Tunnel and the Koralm Railway in combination will enable freight transit along the entire southern line using just one locomotive.

Construction began on 25 April 2012 and the link is expected to enter operational service in 2029, delayed from the original estimate of 2026. The total project volume was originally projected at about €3.1 billion; in early 2025, costs were estimated to rise to €4.2 billion.

Prior to the commissioning of the Koralm Railway in December 2025, the fastest Vienna-Graz and Vienna-Klagenfurt journeys on the Railjet services were 2 hours 35 minutes and 3 hours 55 minutes long, respectively. The Koralm Railway enables Graz-Klagenfurt journeys of approximately 45 minutes, and (by rerouting via Graz rather than Leoben) reduces Vienna-Klagenfurt journey times to around 3 hours 25 minutes. The Semmering Base Tunnel is projected to enable time savings of an additional 45 minutes, which will enable journeys from Vienna to Graz and Klagenfurt of 1 hour 50 minutes and 2 hours 40 minutes, respectively.

== History ==
=== Background ===
The Semmering railway, which was constructed between 1848 and 1854, holds the distinction of being the first railway to traverse the Alps, and has been commonly referred to as the world's first true mountain railway. The historic significance of this traditional route is such that it has been declared a World Heritage Site by UNESCO. By the turn of the 21st century, a total of 70,000 goods and passenger trains were reportedly being run through the Semmering railway during each year, it is one of the busiest routes in Austria.

In order to relieve pressure upon the original route, interest grew in the development of a more direct route over the Alps. These notions soon centered around the concept of boring a base tunnel at a significantly lower altitude. During 2006, a two-year route selection process was conducted; in April 2008, it was announced that the southernmost route had been determined to be the optimum of those studied. During the later half of 2009, the final route for the proposed Semmering Base Tunnel was selected; this ran between Gloggnitz and the Mürzzuschlag-Langenwang area.

Specifically, the tunnel comprises twin-parallel bores, each possessing a diameter of 10 meters and separated by up to 70 meters; for safety reasons, connecting 56 cross-passages between the two bores are to occur at regular intervals of up to 500 meters. Being significantly faster than the Semmering line, it would enable a reduction in the travel time between the cities of Vienna and Graz.

The Semmering Base Tunnel has a gradient of 0.84 per cent. This gradient was selected to enable it to be used by heavy freight trains with only a single locomotive. The plan involves several infrastructure changes, such as the integration of the railway stations at Gloggnitz and Mürzzuschlag with the proposed route. Outside of railway infrastructure, a flood protection scheme is required to mitigate against the risk posed by the nearby River Schwarza while the relocation of the B27 road would also be necessary.

=== Contractors ===
The primary contracts for the construction of the Semmering Base Tunnel is divided into three contract sections. During 2014, the contract for the construction of the 13 km-long central section of the tunnel, valued at approximately €623 million ($827 million), was awarded to a consortium of Implenia and Swietelsky. A separate contract was awarded to Amberg Engineering for it to conduct tunnel excavation works, while Strabag was engaged to conduct drilling activities. During 2010, BGG Consult was awarded a contract to provide geotechnical and hydrogeological consulting services during both the tendering and construction phases of the programme.

The Austrian Federal Railways contracted the planning of the proposed Semmering Base Tunnel's route to a consortium of Werner Consult and Witrisal consortium to conduct the route planning for the tunnel. Separately, Gruner AG was also involved in the design for the new twin-tube tunnels; this work included its aerodynamics and environmental control, including operational and emergency ventilation systems. Soil mechanical and geotechnical consulting services at the intermediate sites at Fröschnitzgraben and Grautschenhof by INSITU Geotechnics.

In June 2024, Porr and Rhomberg Sersa Rail Group were awarded a €176 million fit-out contract for the tunnel. In March 2025, Rhomberg Sersa Rail Group and Porr were awarded a €76 million contract to install slab track in the tunnel.

== Construction ==
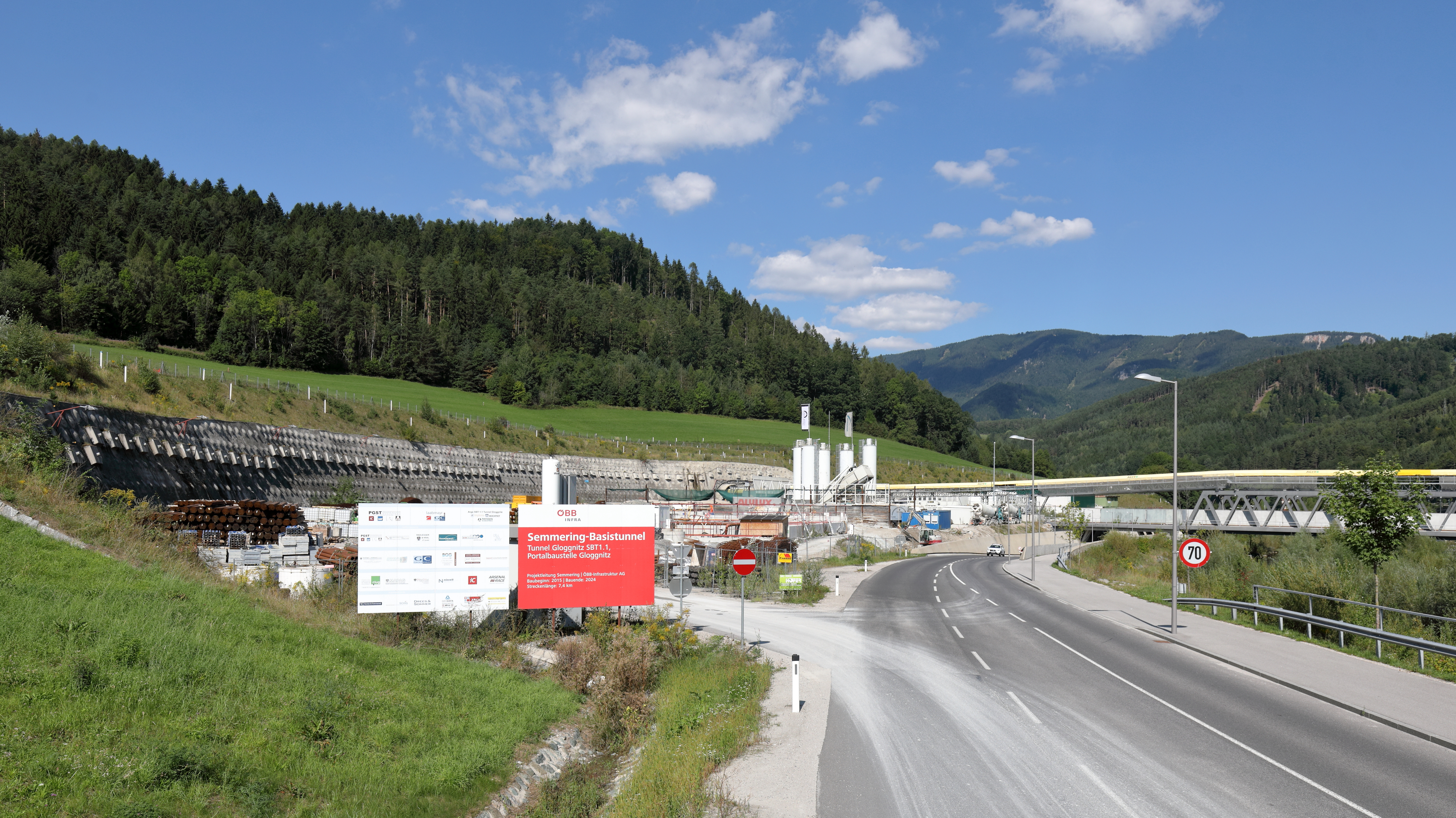
Northern tunnel portal at Gloggnitz (2019)

During 2012, preparatory ground works for the SBT commenced. On 7 January 2014, construction began upon the tunnel's central section. Work on this section involved boring work along a length of 8.6 km, while a drill-and-blast method for the remaining 4.3 km section. The central section is to consist of 26 crossover passages between the two tunnels, along with an emergency station; a pair of 420 metre-deep ventilation shafts are also to be dug. By 7 June 2016, work on the third section of the SBT had commenced; this meant that full-rate construction activity upon the project, which was reportedly costed at €3.3 billion as of this point in time, was now underway.

To facilitate the construction work, three intermediate sites were established near to Göstritz, Fröschnitzgraben and Grautschenhof. At Göstritz, a 1,000 metre access gallery and multiple 250 metre-deep shafts were constructed to facilitate conventional tunnel excavation methods. At Fröschnitzgraben, a pair of 420 metre-deep shafts, possessing a diameter of 22 metres, were dug ahead of the deployment of tunnel boring machines. Once assembled, these were used to create the bore towards Gloggnitz. Breakthrough of this section occurred on 10 June 2022.

Additional major works included construction of entrances in Gloggnitz and Mürzzuschlag, as well as ventilation shafts at Trattenbach and Sommerau. Substations located at Gloggnitz and Langenwang are intended to be used to supply electricity to the trains that will run through the SBT. Beyond the tunnel itself, ancillary work involves the construction of two new railway bridges, as well as a new road bridge and an underpass for the B27.

Owing to encountering difficulties with the complex geology in the area, including the fault zone being traversed during construction and different rock types, an additional cost of €390 million was added taking the total cost to €3.9 billion, with measures to mitigate these risks in 2021 being unsuccessful.

On 29 November 2024, it was announced that the final breakthrough of the tunnel had been completed, marking the end of all excavation activities. Since summer 2025, fit-out of the twin-bore tunnel is taking place, including track, power supply systems, and other infrastructure needed for operational services. This is expected to continue until its opening by the end of 2029.

On 19 May 2026, the first crossing of the tunnel took place in an electric minibus.
