= Gloggnitz =

Town in eastern Austria

- Municipality
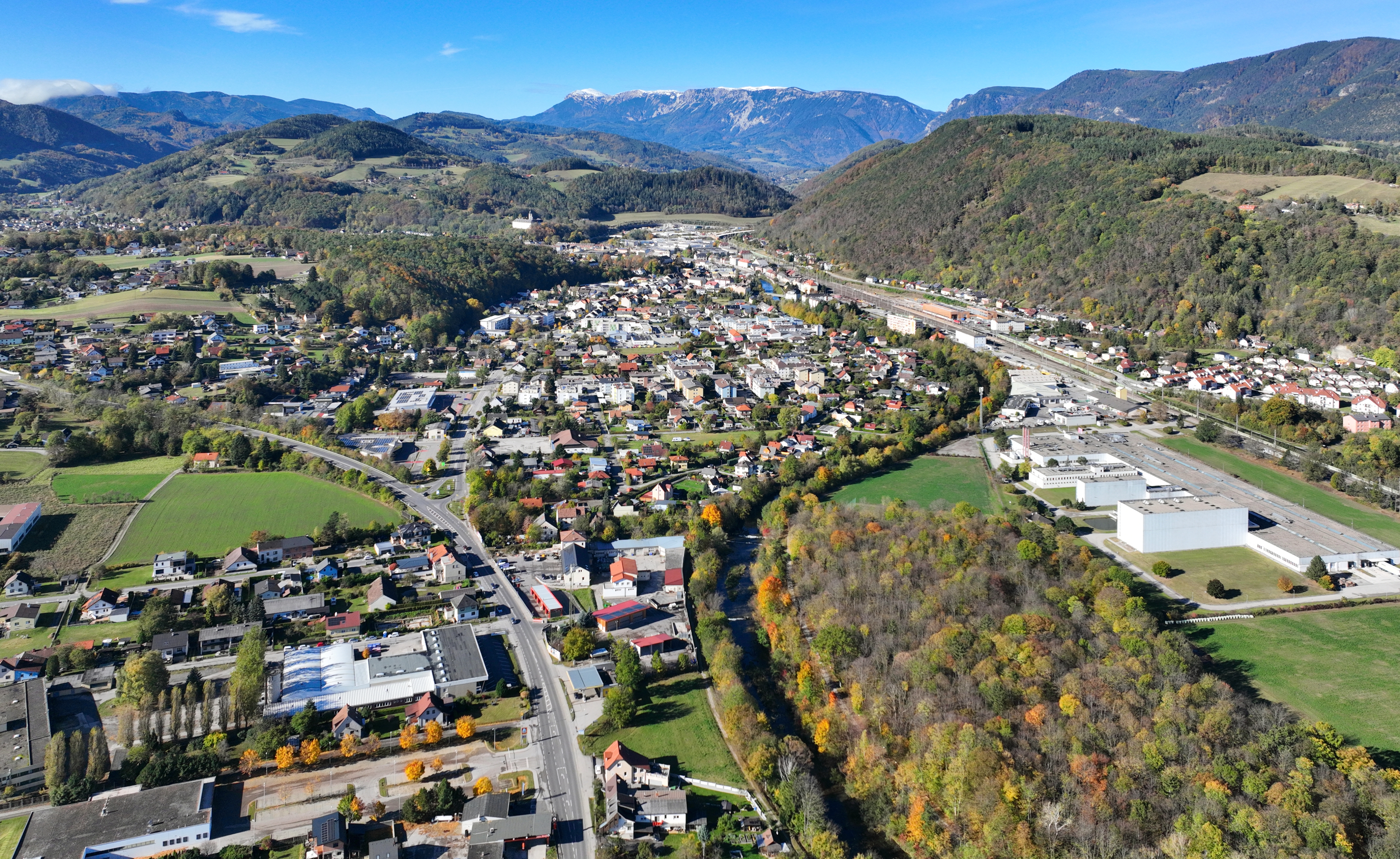
- East view of Gloggnitz

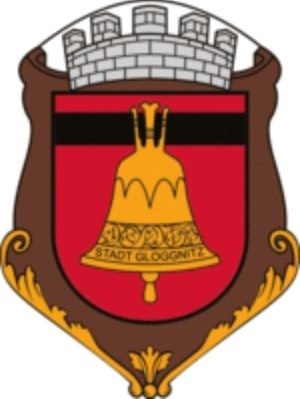
- Coat of arms

- Location within Austria
- Coordinates: 47°40.554′N 15°56.194′E
- Country: Austria
- State: Lower Austria
- District: Neunkirchen

Government
  - Mayor: René Blum

Area
  - Total: 19.58 km^{2} (7.56 sq mi)
- Elevation: 498 m (1,634 ft)

Population (2018-01-01)
  - Total: 5,916
  - Density: 302.1/km^{2} (782.6/sq mi)
- Time zone: UTC+1 (CET)
  - Summer (DST): UTC+2 (CEST)
- Postal code: 2640, 2671
- Area code: 0266
- Website: www.gloggnitz.at

Gloggnitz is a mountain town in the Neunkirchen district of Lower Austria, Austria.

Gloggnitz is situated in the south-western part of the Vienna Basin in Lower Austria. It is surrounded by the highest mountains in Lower Austria, Mount Rax (2,007 m or 6,585 ft) and Mount Schneeberg (2,076 m or 6,811 ft). The town is also a major traffic junction: Gloggnitz is situated on the main Südbahn (the important rail route between Vienna and Trieste in Italy) and the S6 motorway.

Gloggnitz is famous for producing two of Austria's most distinguished Federal Presidents. Federal President Dr Michael Hainisch (1858–1940) and the Chancellor of State and later Federal President Dr Karl Renner (1870–1950) were both Gloggnitz citizens. Dr Karl Renner spent 42 years of his life in Gloggnitz (up until his death in 1950). On the occasion of the anniversary of his hundredth birthday a monument was erected in Dr Karl Renner Square. A museum in his former residence also commemorates the life of this highly respected former Gloggnitz resident.

== Sights and Monuments ==
=== Gloggnitz Provostry ===
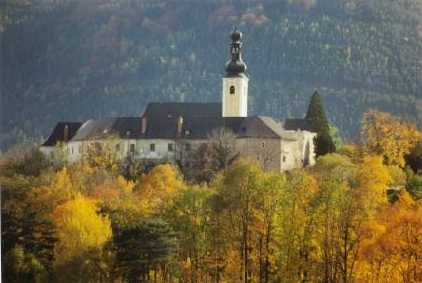
Gloggnitz Provostry with the old Catholic parish church

Gloggnitz Provostry is a former medieval (gothic) Catholic monastery and a later secularised (baroque) complex of buildings, including the old Catholic parish church of Gloggnitz. It was also the home of the nationally renowned exhibition, "Lower Austrian Landesausstellung 1992".

=== Christ the King Church ===
This is the new Catholic parish church, designed by the world-famous Austrian architect Prof Clemens Holzmeister. It was completed in 1962.

=== St Othmar's Chapel ===
This is one of Gloggnitz's oldest buildings. The estimated date of construction lies between 1001 and 1102 A.D. This date is dependent upon different historical appraisals. It is situated in the town centre (Hauptplatz).

=== The Aue Herrenhaus ===
The Herrenhaus is a baroque manor-house and the birthplace of Dr. Michael Hainisch, the first Federal President of the First Republic of Austria. Unfortunately the building is now in ruins.

=== Stuppach Palace ===
Stuppach Palace is the place where possibly a primal chamber musical version of Mozart's Requiem was premiered by an ensemble, conducted by Count Francis of Walsegg-Stuppach, the sponsor of the now world-famous Requiem. The palace was restored in 1996.

=== The Renner Museum ===
This was the residential mansion of Karl Renner, the first Federal President of the Second Republic of Austria.

== Economy and Industry ==
There have been changes in all branches of the Gloggnitz economy within the past 30 years. Within this period Gloggnitz developed from a local commercial centre and railway junction into an economically active town. Today Gloggnitz has several internationally active companies, employing hundreds of people.

== History ==
The place name "Gloggnitz" descends from the Slavic word "Klokati", which means "bubble" or "murmur", and was first mentioned in 1094. "Clocniza" or "Glocniza" means "Murmuring River".

Monks from the Bavarian monastery of Formbach built a hermitage near the River Schwarza. This led to the establishment of a provostry for Gloggnitz. In the 15th century the monks and local inhabitants were active farmers, craftsmen, and wine makers. Later climate changes made the conditions for winemaking less favourable and as a consequence unprofitable.

For over 900 years (until the 19th century) the economic and social life of Gloggnitz and its local area was highly influenced and controlled by the monasterial lords of the manor. The town's favourable position on the strategic arterial route from Lower Austria to Italy encouraged colonisation and the small village of Gloggnitz grew. Gloggnitz also achieved the distinction of being able to hold its own market.

In 1660 Emperor Leopold I visited Gloggnitz. When the French conqueror Napoleon Bonaparte travelled south across the Semmering Pass in 1809, he also made a short overnight stay in Gloggnitz. On 17 August 1841 Emperor Ferdinand I opened the new Semmering Pass Road. Other visits by famous persons to Gloggnitz include: Emperor Francis Joseph I (1850 and 1854), Crown Prince Rudolph and his wife Princess Gisela (1862).

== Tourism ==
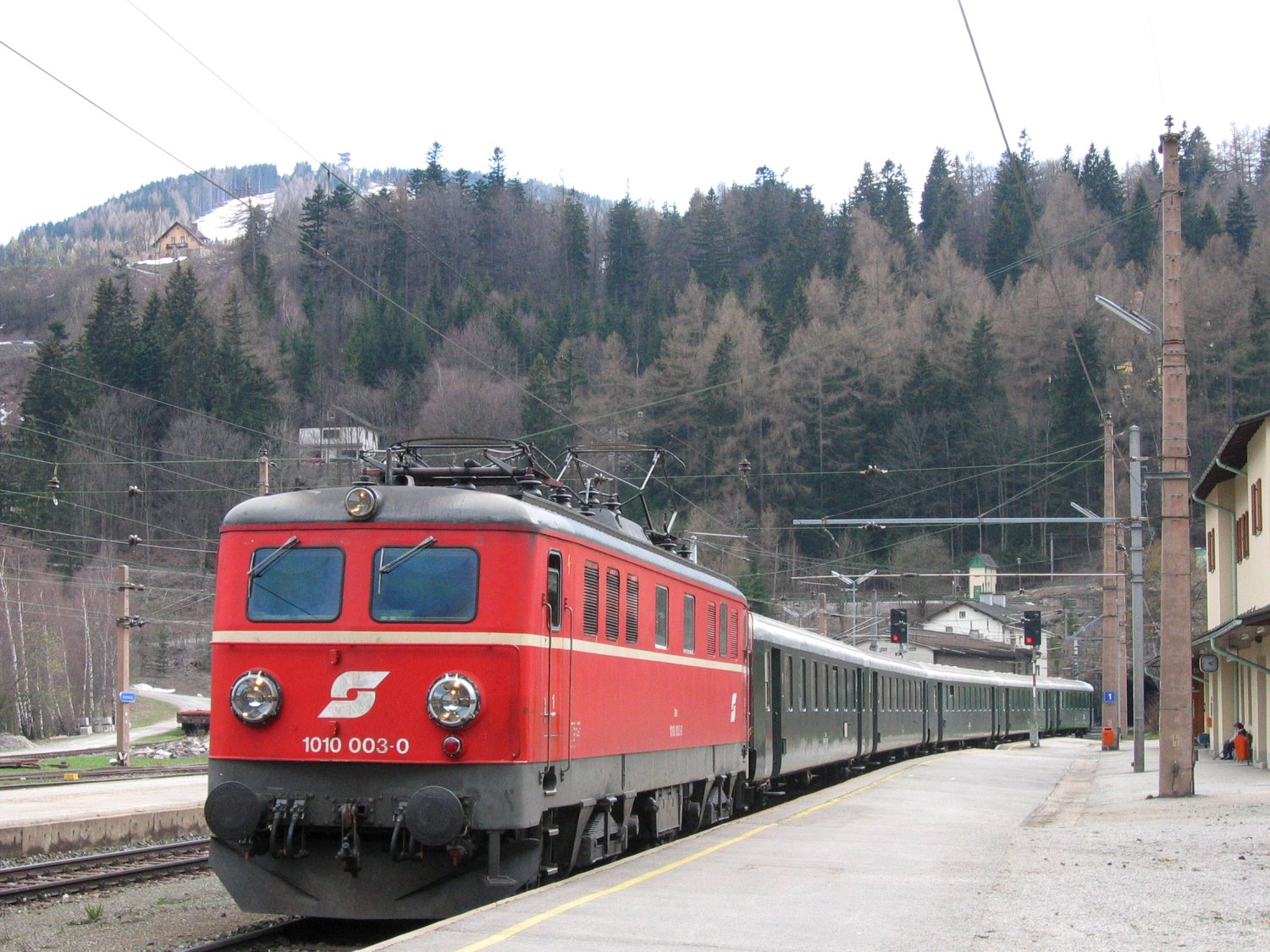
Semmering Railway

The building of the Semmering Railway encouraged further progress. On 5 May 1842, the first train on the "Südbahn" arrived in Gloggnitz. In its earliest years the railway opened up the mountain scenery to the people of Vienna. Thousands of tourists visited Gloggnitz and went hiking around Vienna's so-called "Home Mountains", Mount Rax and Mount Schneeberg. In 1854 the railway passage over Semmering was established.

The number of Gloggnitz houses and citizens increased steadily between 1796 and 1836. Prior to the arrival of the railway, the town had a rate of growth of 11% in buildings and 14% in population. Between 1836 and 1876 the rate of new building rose to 142% and there was a huge 284% rise in the local population.

Gloggnitz was granted town status on 5 May 1926. On 2 January 1927 Federal President Dr Michael Hainisch, Federal Chancellor Dr Ignaz Seipel and the then former Chancellor of State Dr Karl Renner addressed a big audience when they granted Gloggnitz the grant of privileges due to a town.

World War II and the unsettled post-war period meant many upheavals in the lives of the citizens of Gloggnitz. There were many structural changes, particularly in relation to the labour market and the development of housing. It took decades until the town regained the opportunity to take measures to boost its tourist industry.

In 1972 Gloggnitz became a member of the Semmering-Rax-Schneeberg Tourism Association. This partnership has been beneficial in promoting Gloggnitz and its surrounding area as sites of interest to both national and international visitors. The more-than-900-year-old town of Gloggnitz is still an important traffic junction in the east of Austria and has not lost any of its geographical significance.

Alongside municipal buildings, the historical monuments of the town are also being constantly cared for and restored. A new town hall was built and opened in September 2003. In 1992 Gloggnitz was the location of Lower Austria's biggest exhibition, the "Lower Austrian Landesausstellung". The exhibition provided funds for the full restoration of the former monastery. Today Gloggnitz Provostry is used as a "wedding castle" and site for various exhibitions.
