= Koralm Tunnel =

Railway tunnel in southern Austria

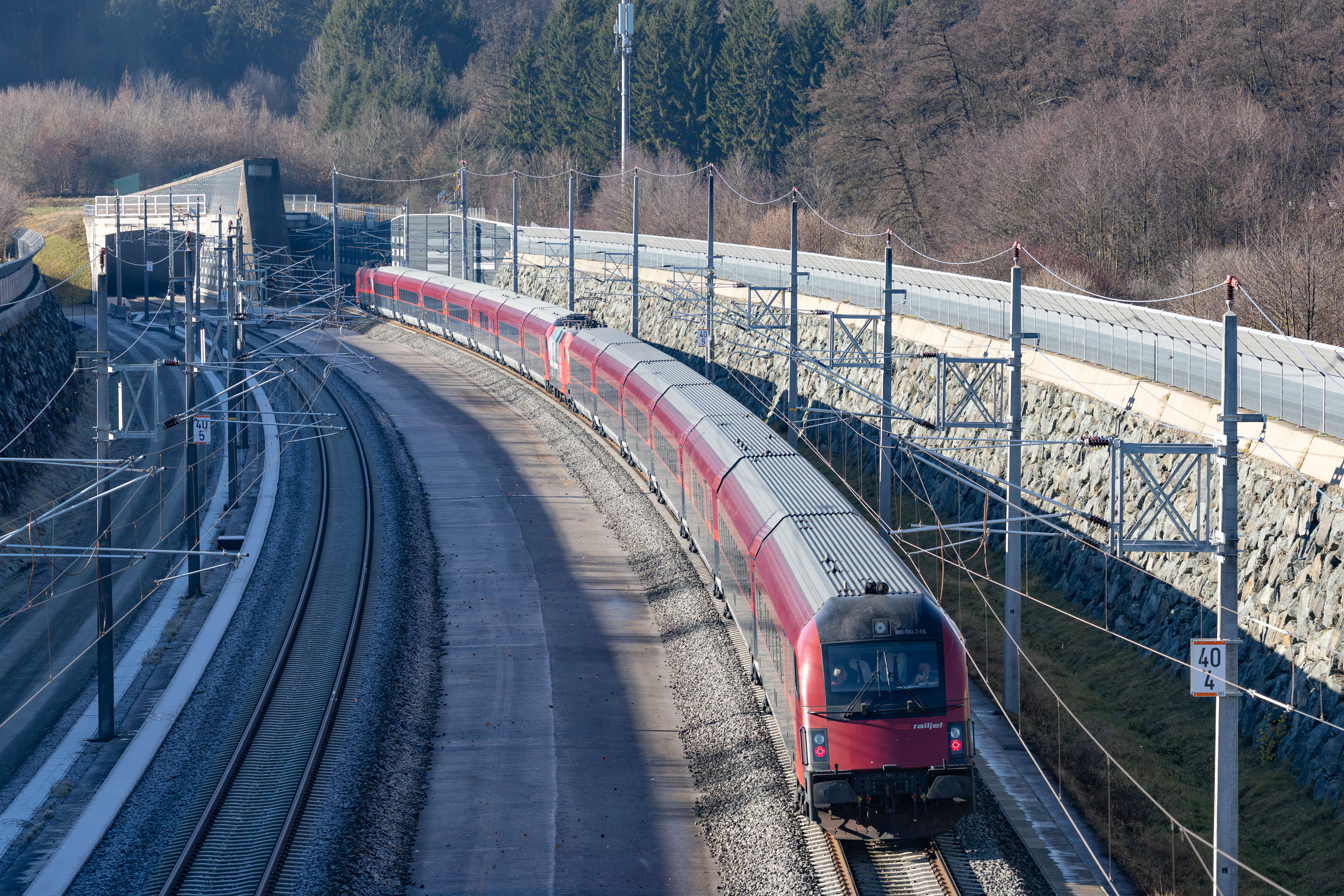
- East portal with Railjet train in 2025
- Interactive map of Koralm Tunnel

Overview
- Line: Koralmbahn
- Location: Styria/Carinthia (Austria)
- Coordinates: 46°45′12″N 15°1′52″E
- Status: Active
- Start: Frauental
- End: Sankt Andrä

Operation
- Work began: 2008
- Opened: 12 December 2025
- Traffic: railway

Technical
- Length: 32.9 km (20.4 mi)
- No. of tracks: 2 single-track tunnels

The Koralm Tunnel (Koralmtunnel) is a railway tunnel in Austria under the Koralpe mountain range. It forms one section of the 130 km (81 mi)-long Koralm Railway which links Graz with Klagenfurt. With a length of 32.9 km (20.4 mi), it is Austria's longest railway tunnel and runs at depths of up to 1,250 m (4,100 ft) below ground. It comprises a pair of tunnels running in parallel, each capable of carrying a single railway track, which are linked together every 500 metres (1,600 ft).

The Koralm Tunnel was officially opened on December 12, 2025, with regular service starting on the 14th.

== History ==
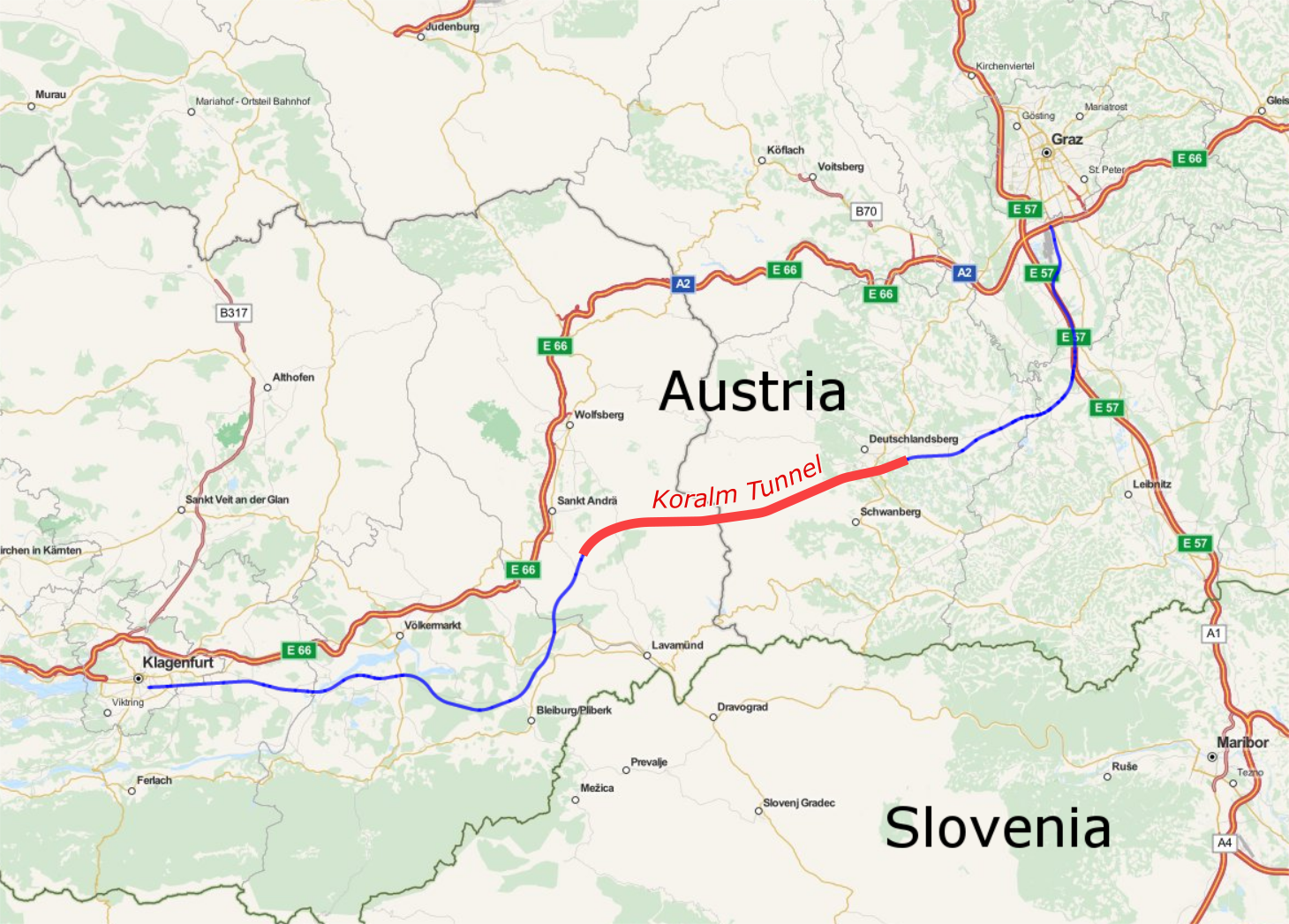
The Koralm tunnel forms part of the Koralm Railway in southern Austria

The Koralm Tunnel is perhaps the most significant engineering feature of the Koralm Railway, Austria's most southern line. The route is designed to allow a maximum speed of 250 km/h wherever economically feasible, to shorten journey times between Vienna and Klagenfurt via Graz by over an hour for an estimated journey time of two hours and 40 minutes. It also improves rail freight between ports on the Adriatic and Baltic Seas. Numerous regional figures in Styria have promoted the tunnel's construction as helping to address the comparatively limited railway infrastructure of the mountainous region compared with the rest of Austria and that, once in service, the tunnel ought to bring considerable economic benefits and investment to local businesses.

During 1995, the Austrian Government authorised the Austrian Federal Railways to proceed with the planning and designing of the Koralm Railway, including the Koralm Tunnel; in addition to finalising the route selection and legal preparations, extensive environmental surveys were conducted. Prior to the construction process, extensive studies of the local geology were performed; during 2002, the first of a series of test bores, eventually totalling 130 exploratory wells, was driven in the vicinity of the future tunnel. During the 2010s, the Koralm Railway program was the largest project of its nature taking place in the country.

In 2013, work commenced on boring the tunnel. The process of driving the tunnel's twin bores involved in excess of 800 personnel and three tunnel boring machines (TBMs), it was reportedly considered to be a world-first to continuously use a TBM upon hard rock for more than 17km. The excavation involved the removal of six million cubic metres of spoil, of which two-thirds was reused as bulk material for various noise barriers, railway embankments, filter gravel or aggregate in concrete. In addition to the TBMs, traditional drilling and blasting techniques were also employed in places. To limit the ingress of ground water into the tunnel, approximately 132,000 m² of AGRUFLEX tunnel liners were installed along its length. Extensive attention was paid to ensuring adequate drainage throughout its length.

In 2017, completion of the tunnel was anticipated to occur in 2023, while the full extent of the line would be commissioned during the following year. However, during 2018, Transport Minister Norbert Hofer announced that the tunnel's rate of construction had been significantly slowed by challenging geology; ÖBB spokesman Christoph Posch stated that the timetable changes were not attributable to austerity measures but to unpredicted fault zones discovered during the tunneling process. At that point in time, the Koralm Tunnel was expected to be completed by December 2025 and to become operational by 2026. Other regional infrastructure projects have been impacted by the delayed completion of the tunnel, such as the doubling of the railway in the vicinity of Jauntal Bridge.

On 14 August 2018, breakthrough was achieved in the south bore. On 18 June 2020, it was announced that breakthrough had been achieved in the north bore, marking the completion of all tunnelling along the Koralm railway. Accordingly, work transitioned to the fitting-out phase, during which the tunnel is to be furnished with its interior shell along with all equipment and fixtures required for operational use. Furthermore, operational safety features shall be installed along the tunnel's length, such as cross-passages every 500 meters along with a single emergency station positioned at roughly the half way point, which shall have intentionally staggered platforms and a reinforced refuge room with a length of 800 meters.

On 12 June 2023 the first test train passed through the tunnel.
