= Semmering Pass =

Mountain pass in Austria

Semmering
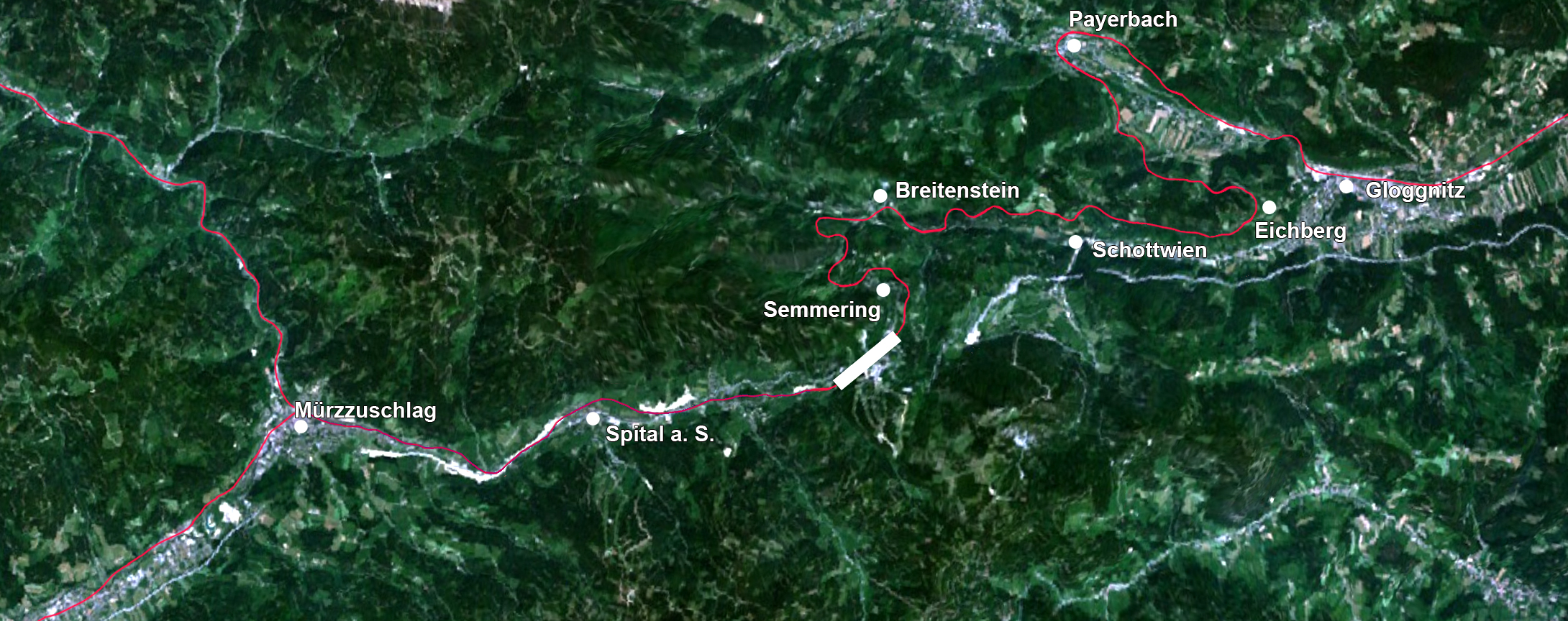
- Satellite photo of the Semmering

- Location within Alps
- Interactive map of Semmering
- Elevation: 965 metres (3,166 ft)

Third Approach
- Location: Austria
- Range: Alps
- Coordinates: 47°37′57″N 15°49′47″E

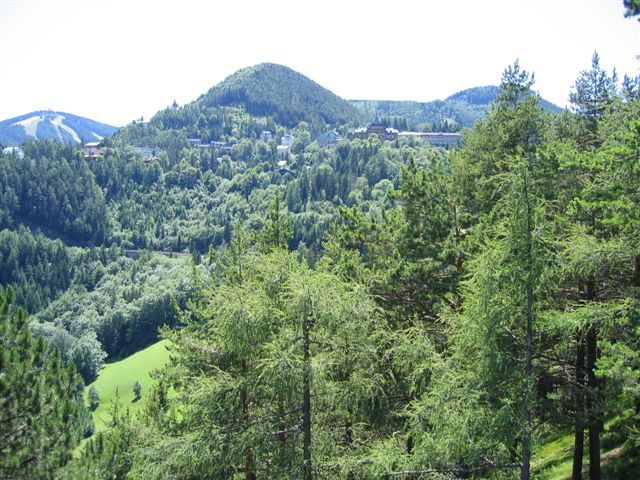
Semmering

Semmering (pronounced [ˈzɛməʁɪŋ]) is a mountain pass in the Eastern Northern Limestone Alps connecting Lower Austria and Styria, between which it forms a natural border.

== Location ==
Semmering Pass is located west of Sonnwendstein and Hirschenkogel and east of the Pinkenkogel.

With the Wechsel Pass, the Semmering is the most important connection between Lower Austria and Styria. It can be crossed by road (via an Autobahn with a tunnel or on the local street on top), or using the Semmering Railway in a short tunnel. A longer Railway tunnel is currently under construction.

The village of Semmering is on the pass. The villages of Maria Schutz and Spital am Semmering are slightly below the pass, on the Lower Austrian and Styrian sides respectively. Schottwien and Mürzzuschlag are the closest sizeable towns on either side.

== Rail transportation ==
As the Semmering is a major bottleneck in the Austrian railway network, the Semmering Railway, which is a UNESCO World Heritage site, is planned to be supplemented by a tunnel at the base of the mountains. The project is supported by the Austrian Federal Government and the governments of Styria and Carinthia, but has been heavily opposed by the government of Lower Austria, which stalled the project by issuing negative environmental impact statements. The project has now been revised according to the advanced state of technology and the layout of the line has been altered in order to minimize effects on ground water.

A ground-breaking ceremony was held at Gloggnitz on April 25, 2012 to officially launch preliminary construction works for the 27.3 km Semmering Base Tunnel. Opening is planned for 2030. The €3·1bn base tunnel between Gloggnitz and Mürzzuschlag is a key part of the 'new Südbahn' project. It will eliminate the current bottleneck on the 41 km Semmering Railway route where steep gradients and numerous curves require freight trains to use two or three locomotives.

The tunnel will comprise two 10 m bores between 40 and 70 m apart, linked by cross passages every 500m. Boring is planned to start in 2014, with excavation completed ready for fitting out from 2021. The tunnel will be designed for passenger trains to run at up to 230 km/h, shortening Vienna - Graz journey times by 40 min to 1 h 50 min, which is expected to attract more customers to rail.

Austria 25 Euro 150 Years Semmering Alpine Railway Coin

== Skiing ==
The Semmering ski resort, called Zauberberg, which also hosts World Cup events, is located at the pass and extends on to the Hirschenkogel mountain. It is mainly used by skiers from Vienna, from where it can be reached within one hour, but increasingly also by people from Hungary and Slovakia.

== Numismatics ==
The view was printed on the 20 shilling note from 1966 to 1983.

The Semmering Pass is featured on a famous commemorative coin: the 25 euro 150 Years of the Semmering Alpine Railway Coin. The reverse of the coin shows a typical Semmering view. A steam engine has just emerged from a tunnel crossing one of the distinctive viaducts.

== See also ==
- List of highest paved roads in Europe
- List of mountain passes in Europe
