= Cycling tunnel =

Tunnel designed specifically for cyclists

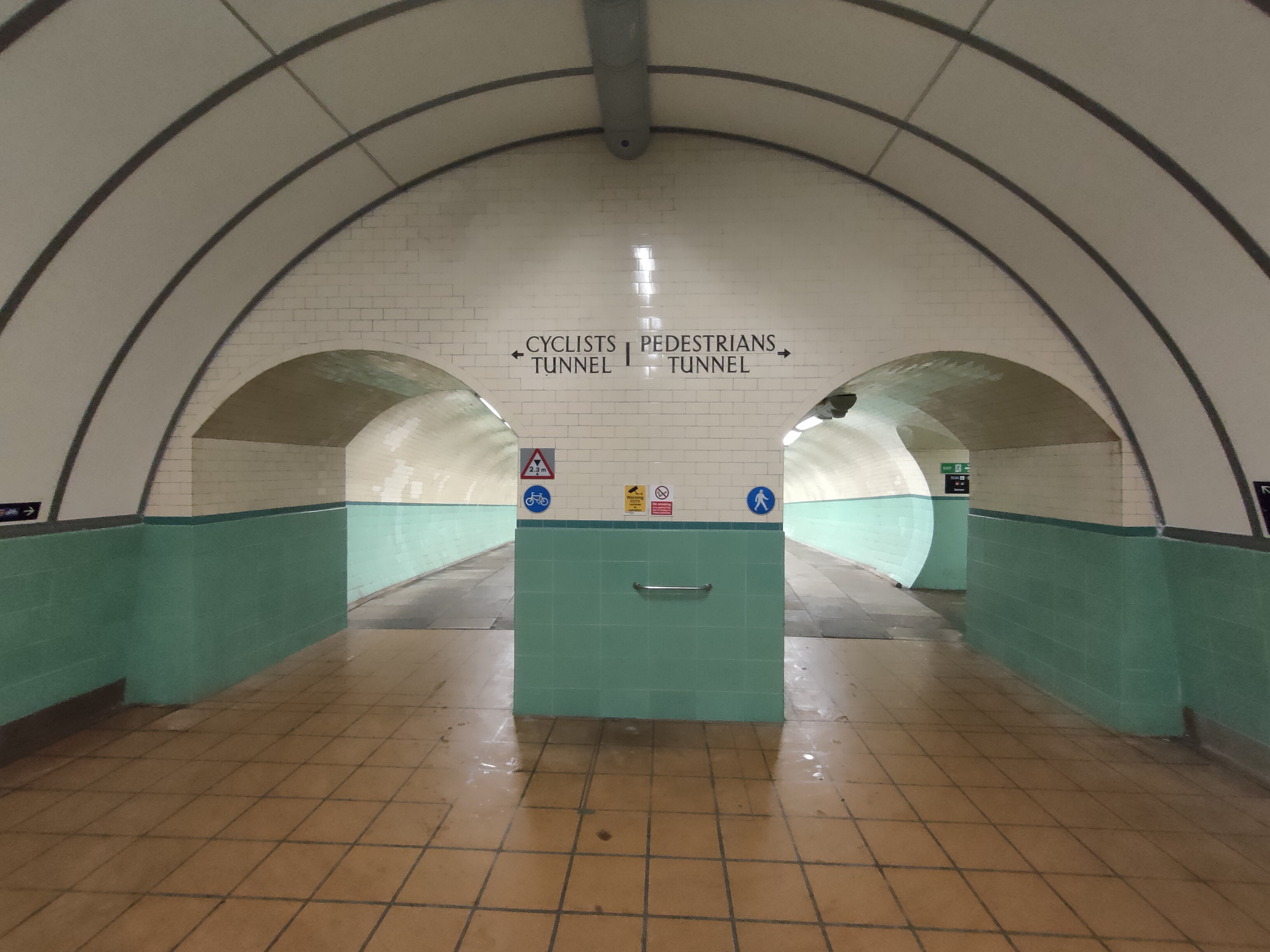
The Tyne cyclist and pedestrian tunnels (270 m), with separate tubes for cyclists and pedestrians

A cycling tunnel or bicycle tunnel is a tunnel designed specifically for cyclists, and can be an essential part of cycling infrastructure. Due to speed differences, cyclists should be separated from faster-moving traffic such as motor vehicles, and sometimes also from slower moving traffic such as pedestrians. To make users feel safe, tunnels should also have an open design and good lighting. It can also be beneficial to have an artificial horizon by designing one-third of the tunnel situated above ground level, and natural lighting at the ends of the tunnel. Some tunnels are also ornamented with street art.

Instead of cycling tunnels, cyclists must sometimes use shared-use tunnels with pedestrians and/or motor vehicles, which can cause conflicts or safety issues between different traffic groups. For example, the Greenwich foot tunnel is a pedestrian tunnel in East London with "No cycling allowed". Having dedicated cycling tunnels (like the Tyne cyclist tunnel in Tyne and Wear, North East England, which has a parallel pedestrian tunnel to separate traffic) follows the principle of segregating the different traffic groups (such as pedestrians and motor vehicles) from cyclists.

== Cycling-only tunnels ==
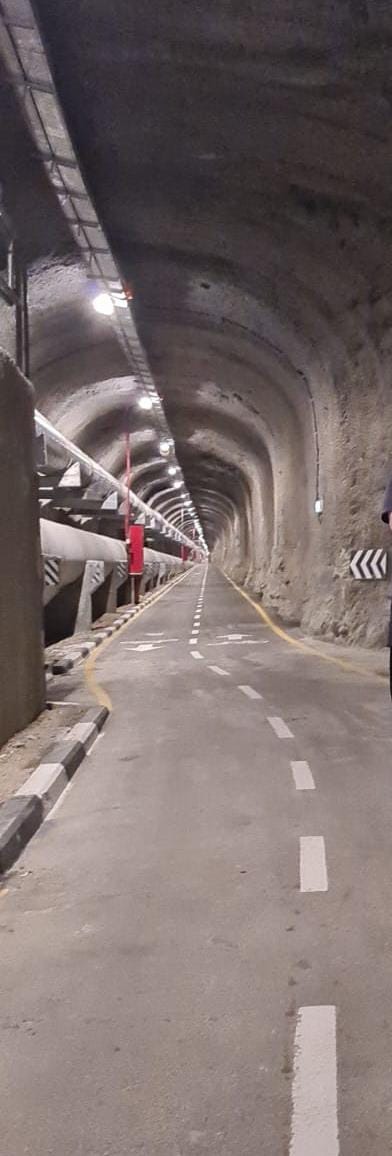
The Kerem Tunnel (2100 m) in Israel, the world's longest tunnel for cyclists only

The longest bicycle tunnel in the world is the Fyllingsdalstunellen, which is located in Bergen, Norway. It is 2,9 kilometer long and has been open since April 15th, 2023.

=== Examples ===
Historically, bicycle tunnels have mostly been used in densely populated areas or areas with mountainous terrain, which otherwise prevent safe bicycle access.

Opened in 1942, the Maastunnel (1070 m) in Rotterdam, Netherlands, is an important tunnel of Rotterdam's road network connecting the banks of the Nieuwe Maas, with two tunnel tubes for the passing of about 75,000 motor vehicles daily, one tube for pedestrians, as well as a separate tube for cyclists.

The Kennedytunnel (690 m), built in 1969, is an important tunnel under the Scheldt river south of Antwerp in Belgium, with four separate tubes: Two for road traffic, one for cyclists, and one for trains. The bicycle tube is 4 meters (13 ft) wide, and pedestrians are allowed.

The tunnel de l'Étoile (380 m) in Paris is a former road tunnel that was repurposed as a bicycle tunnel in 2020. It links the avenue des Champs-Élysées to the avenue de la Grande Armée, passing underneath the place Charles de Gaulle and the Arc de Triomphe.

In 2018, the Kerem Tunnel (2100 m) in southwest Jerusalem became Israel's first cycling tunnel, based on a tunnel originally built in the 1990s. It is part of the Jerusalem Ring Path, a 42-kilometer cycling route, connecting the path between the valley of Rephaim and the valley of Motza.

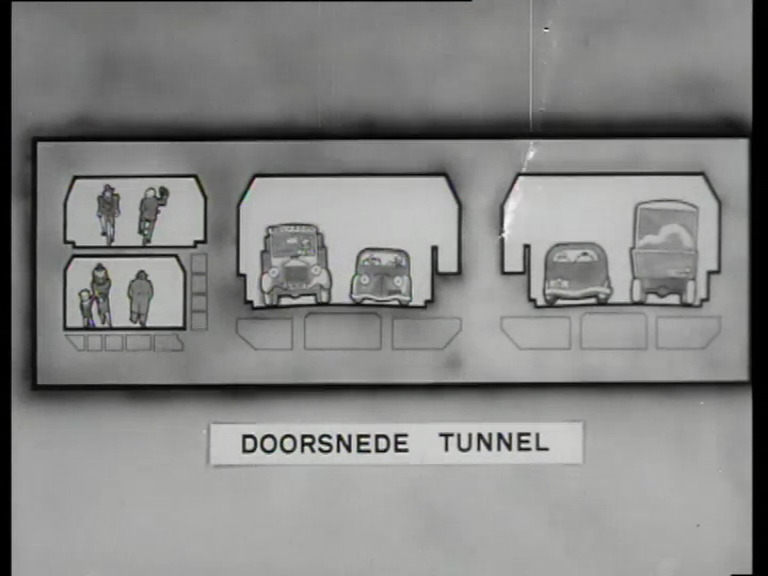
Cross section drawing of the Maastunnel (1070 m) in the Netherlands, showing separate road decks, isolating the different traffic groups of motor vehicles, cyclists and pedestrians from each other (1938 video)

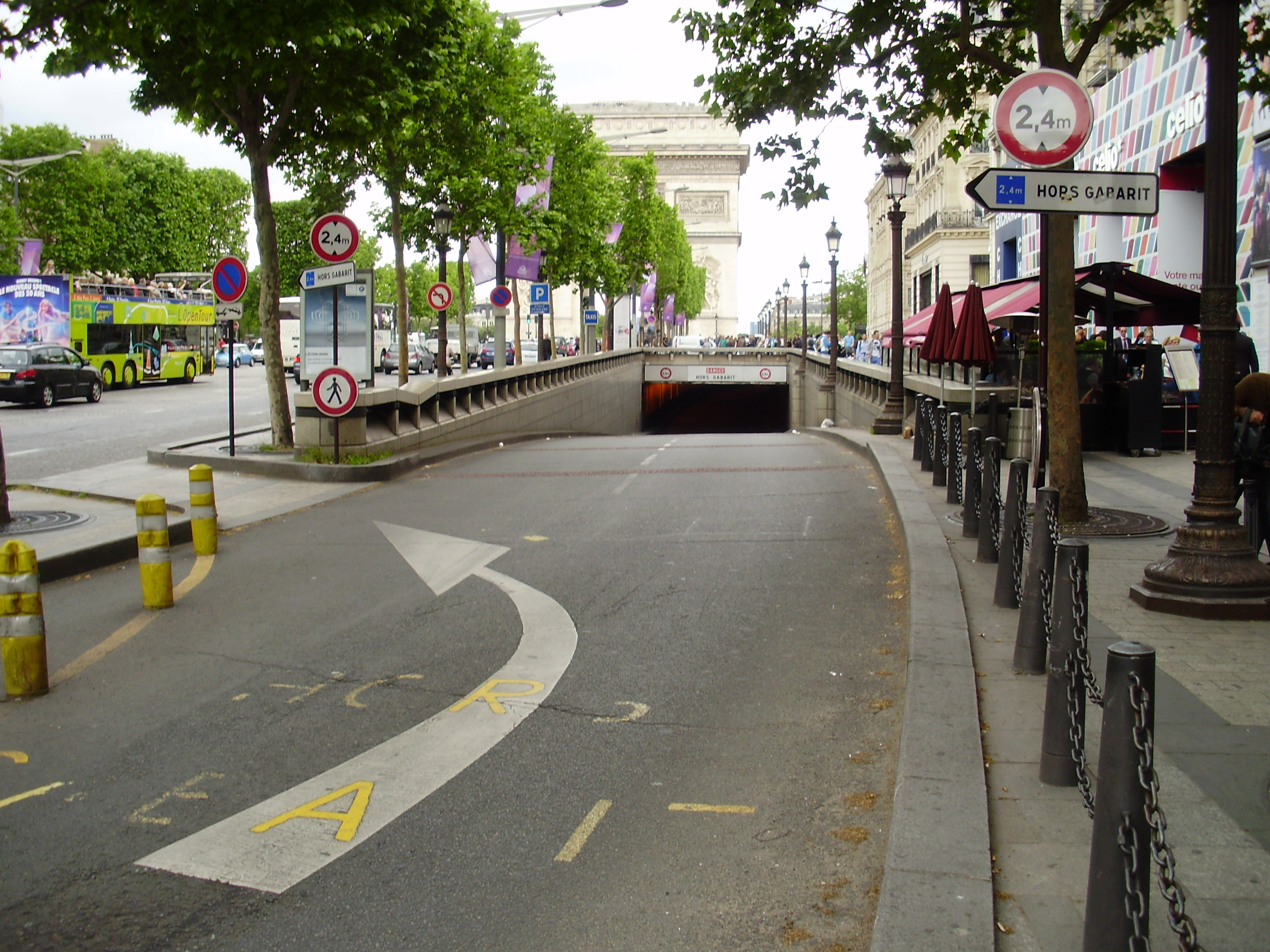
Entrance to the Tunnel de l'Étoile (380 m) in Paris in 2012, now used as a cycling tunnel

== Shared pedestrian and cycling tunnels ==
While shared-use tunnels are not strictly cycling tunnels (i.e., having a shared lane, or a bike lane and footpath without a non-crossable physical separation), they are sometimes used as a cost-saving measure instead of employing separate tubes for cyclists and pedestrians.

The Clyde Tunnel (762 m) crossing beneath the River Clyde in Glasgow, Scotland, was opened in 1963 and connects the districts of Whiteinch to the north and Govan to the south in the west of the city. It has separate road decks for motorized vehicles and a shared deck for pedestrians and cyclists.

The tunnel du Bois Clair (1601 m) is a former railway tunnel from 1870 near Cluny, France, repurposed as a shared-use bicycle and footpath after appearing in the Southern Burgundy Greenway project in 1999. The tunnel is closed during the winter months (mid-October through the end of March) to protect a colony of bats that live in the tunnel. It takes about 7 minutes to travel through by bike.

In 2013, the Combe Down Tunnel became Britain's longest pedestrian and cyclist tunnel at 1672 m.

Fyllingsdaltunellen (2900 m) in Norway is a shared-use tunnel through Løvstakken mountain for pedestrians and cyclists. It opened in 2023, and runs parallel to a light rail tunnel for which it also functions as an escape tunnel. It takes about 9 minutes by bike.

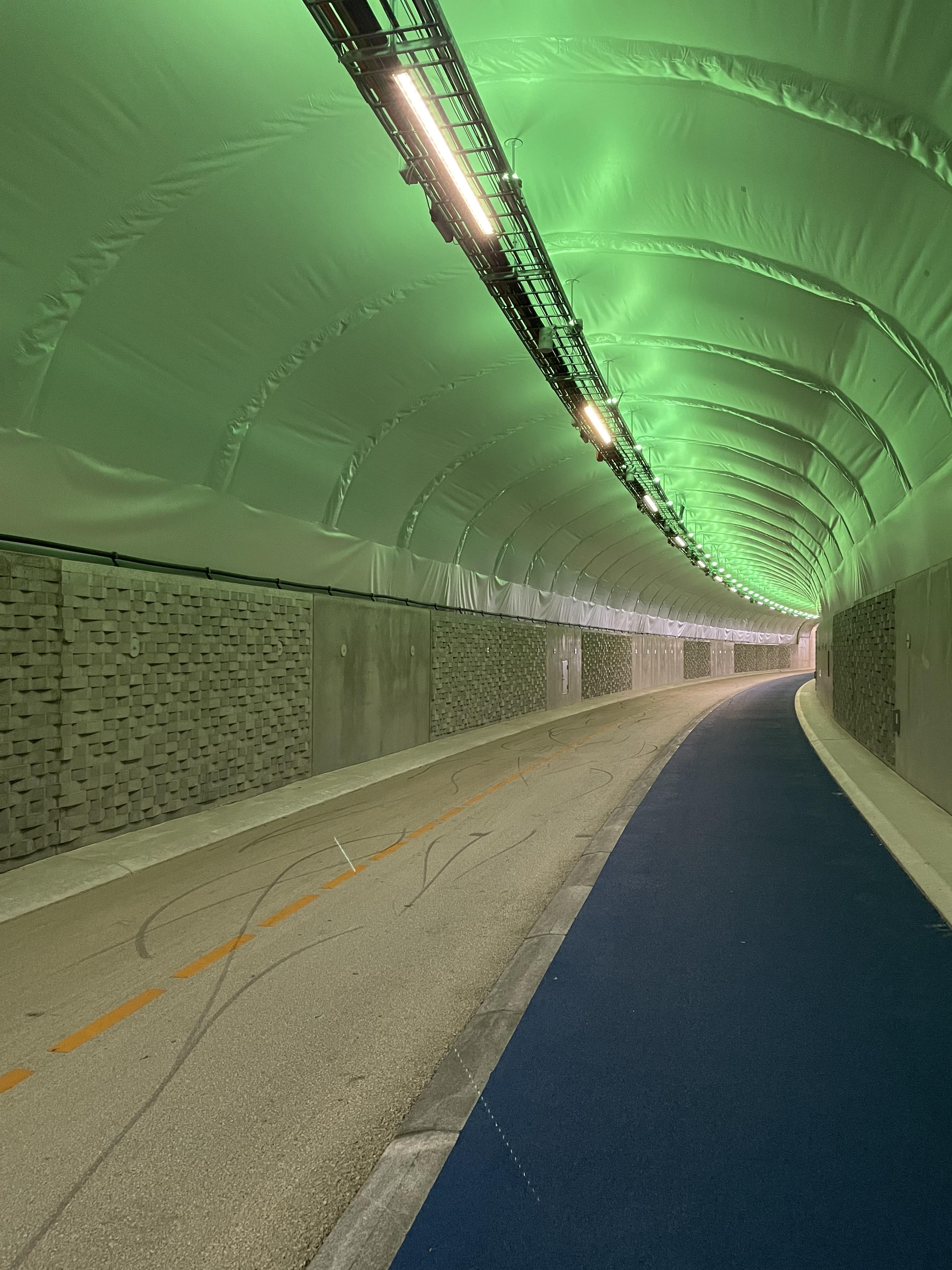
Fyllingsdalstunellen in Norway, a shared-use tunnel (i.e. with a bike lane and footpath; not strictly a cycling tunnel) with a slightly elevated sidewalk

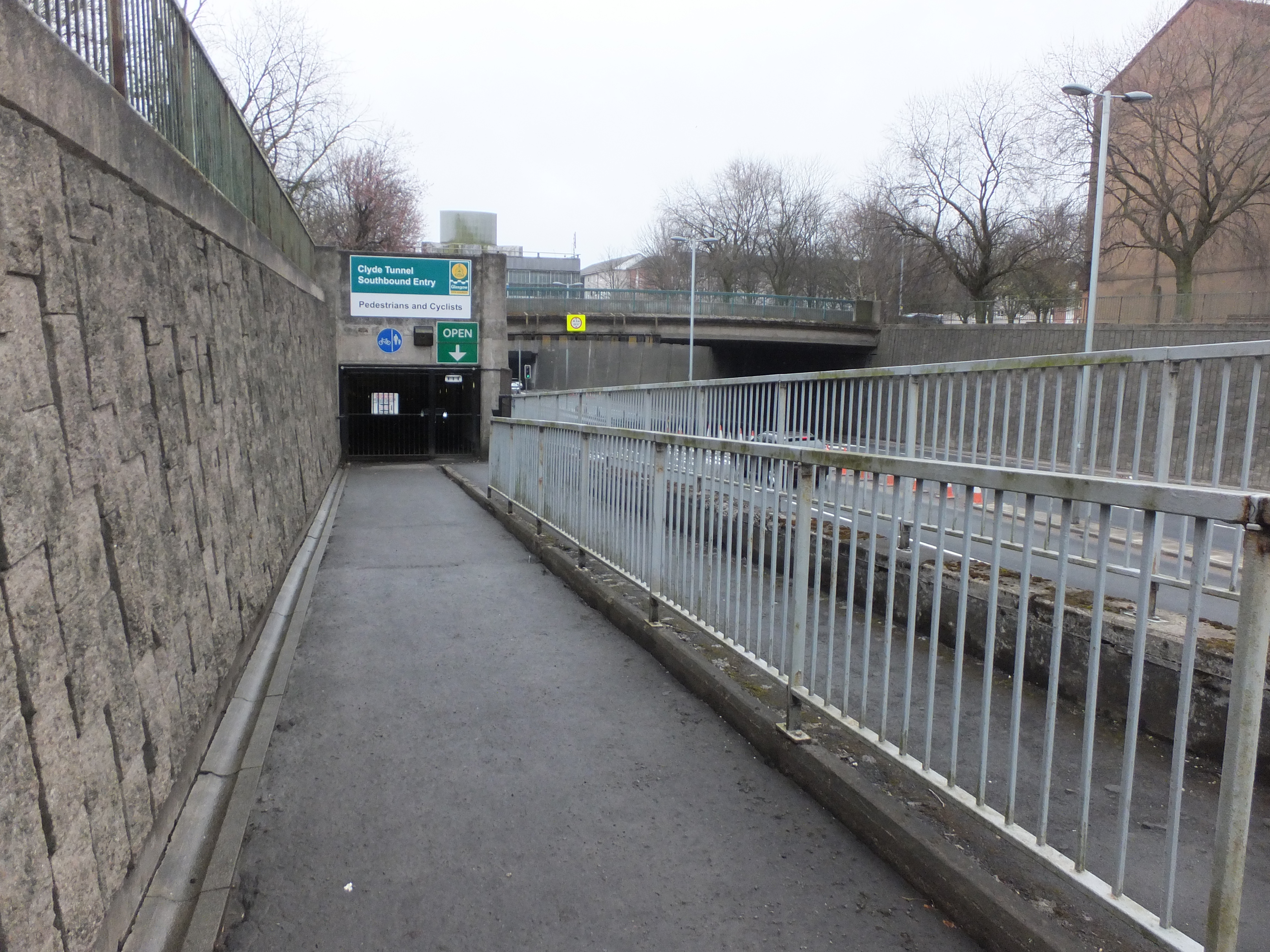
Entrance to the Clyde pedestrian and cyclist tunnel

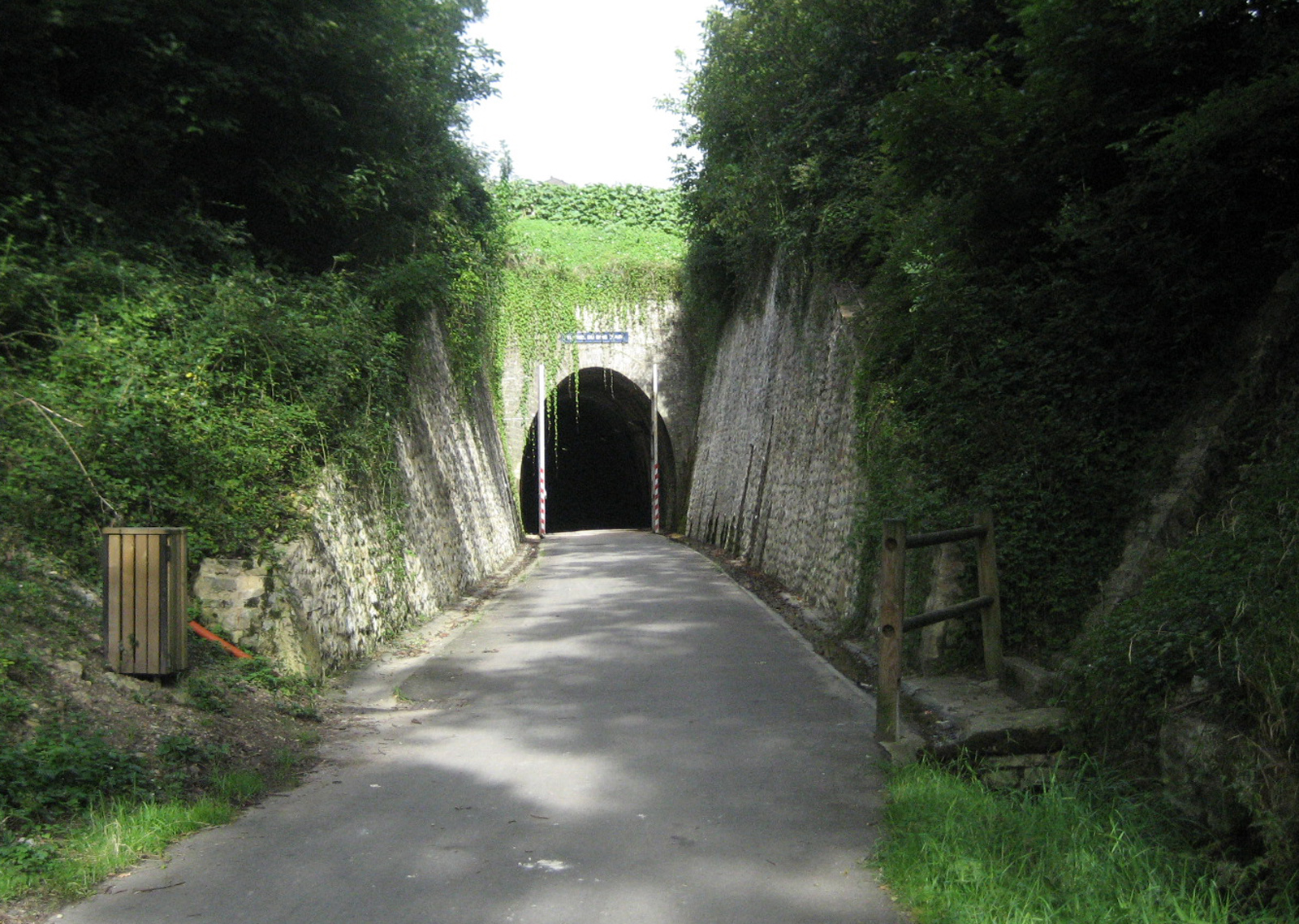
The tunnel du Bois Clair (1601 m), formerly the world's longest shared-use tunnel

== Cycling in road tunnels ==
When looking at road networks as a whole, cycling tunnels are less common than tunnels for cars. For example, in Norway, there are over 1200 car tunnels, but only a few dedicated cycling tunnels. Whether cyclists are allowed in normal road tunnels varies; for example, about one-third of road tunnels in Norway are prohibited for cycling. Even when allowed, normal road tunnels can be both dangerous and frightening for cyclists. Compared to cars, cyclists breathe in free air, are slower moving, and have both limited lighting and protection, resulting in an experience of loud noise, poor air quality and a feeling of disorientation. Road tunnels are often narrow, and not dimensioned (e.g., with a wide enough road shoulder) for safe passing by motor vehicles, especially when unforeseen. Road tunnels may be so dark that even powerful bicycle lights and head torches are not enough for the cyclist to avoid disorientation, resulting in a scary experience for even experienced cyclists.

== Rail trails ==
Railways are generally built with gentle gradients, which can make them well-suited for repurposing as bikeways or rail trails. For example, the Devonshire Tunnel in the United Kingdom has a gradient of 1 in 50 (2% or 1.15°). It now forms one of the eponymous tunnels in the Two Tunnels Greenway together with the Combe Down Tunnel.

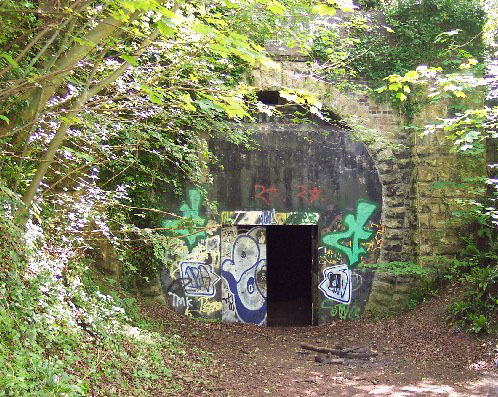
Combe Down Tunnel in 2005 (opened 1874, closed in 1966)

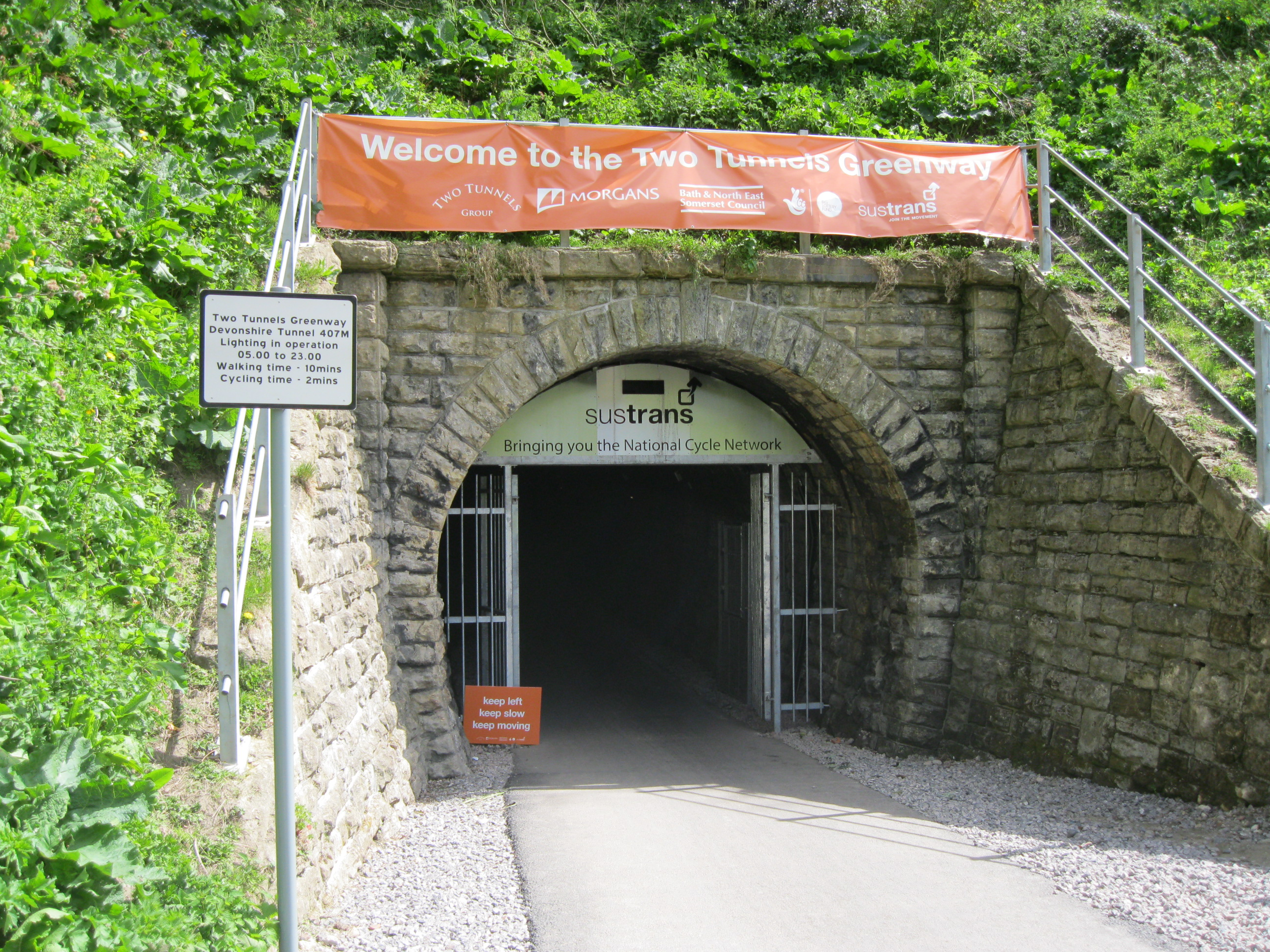
Combe Down Tunnel reopened as a cycling tunnel in 2013

== See also ==
- Rail trail tunnels, sometimes repurposed as cycling or shared-use tunnels
- Subway (underpass), short tunnels for crossing under roadways
- Cycling in the Channel Tunnel (between the United Kingdom and France), normally not allowed; however, on special occasions, crossings have been made via a service tunnel positioned between the two rail tunnel bores
- Boyne Burnett Inland Rail Trail, a recreational route for walkers, cyclists, and horse riders in Australia, containing 6 tunnels
- List of long tunnels by type#Bicycle and pedestrian
