= Moriah Asraf =

Israeli radio and television personality

- מוריה אסרף
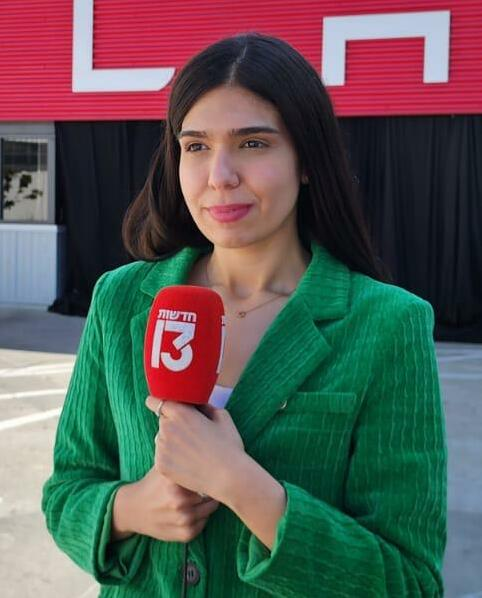
- Moriah Asraf, 2023
- Born: March 25, 1998 (age 28); Tel Mond, Israel
- Education: Tel Aviv University
- Occupations: news presenter, television presenter, journalist
- Years active: 2017–present
- Employer: Channel 13 (Israel)

Moriah Asraf (Hebrew: מוריה אסרף; born 25 March 1998) is an Israeli journalist and a news presenter, currently serving as a diplomatic correspondent for Israeli Channel 13.

== Biography ==
Asraf was born and raised in Tel Mond. She studied at the Tzvia Ulpana in Herzliya, and during her studies there, she broadcast on a youth program on Reshet Aleph (Israel Channel A). She is a graduate of the Lindenbaum Seminary. In 2017, she completed the IDF Radio (Galei Tzahal) reporters' course, and began serving as a legal affairs correspondent for the station.

After her discharge from the IDF, she was appointed as a diplomatic correspondent at Galei Tzahal.

On May 8, 2022, she joined the diplomatic and political desk of "News 13" as a diplomatic correspondent. In August 2024, she began presenting the Saturday news edition on the channel.

Asraf is an undergraduate student in Political Science and History at Tel Aviv University. In 2023, she was selected for the "40 Under 40" list by Israeli Ice website.

On 27 April 2023 a glass bottle was thrown at her and the reporter Yishai Porat while broadcasting a mass right-wing rally in Jerusalem, although Asraf used to support the Prime Minister Benjamin Netanyahu.

Asraf and Galei Tzahal's military correspondent, Doron Kedosh, jointly operate a Telegram channel called "Security-Diplomatic Cabinet – Moriah Asraf & Doron Kedosh", where they provide updates on diplomatic and security matters.

In November 2024, she began co-hosting the podcast "Shadow Reign" with the Knesset correspondent Yuval Segev, which dealt with political life in Israel and reveals behind-the-scenes details about their work.

In March 2025, she began co-hosting a weekly television program, Moriah and Berko, with Eyal Berkovic on Channel 13. (Note: The ex-girl is Ofira Asayag, Ofira and Berkovic, Channel 12 (Israel)) During the Twelve-Day War against Iran, their program switched to a daily broadcast.

== Personal life ==
In 2019, she became engaged to Nahum Wolberg, spokesperson for the Minister of Justice Yariv Levin, whom she met during their joint military service at Galei Tzahal. After their service had ended, they got married. In 2024 they divorced. In January 2025 she became involved with Raz Granot, a deputy CEO of Israel Export Institute.

== See also ==
- Women in journalism and media professions
- Women in Israel
- Journalism in Israel
