= Haim Shapira =

Israeli mathematician, philosopher, and game theorist

Dr. Haim Shapira
- חיים שפירא
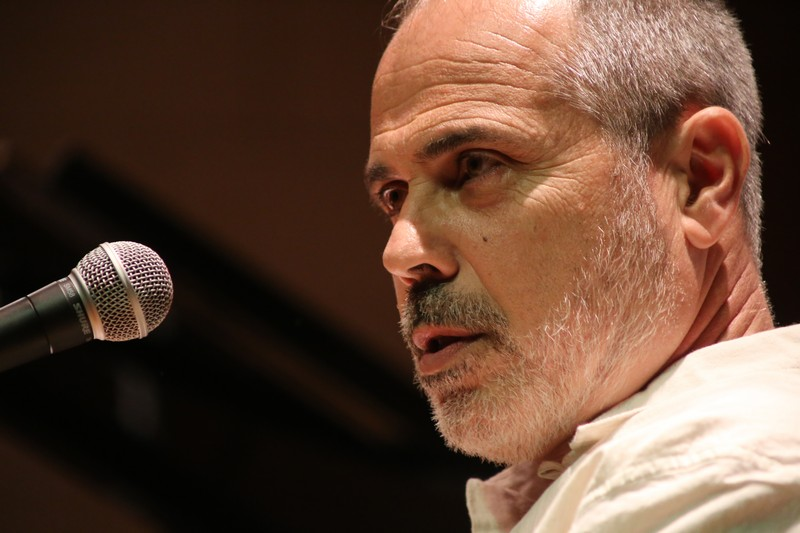
- Shapira lecturing in 2015
- Born: 1962 (age 63–64); Vilnius, Lithuania
- Education: Tel Aviv University
- Known for: Game theory, Philosophy, Music
- Notable work: Happiness and Other Small Things of Absolute Importance, Gladiators, Pirates and Games of Trust
- Scientific career
- Fields: Mathematics, Philosophy, Game theory
- Workplaces: Tel Aviv University, The College of Management Academic Studies

Haim Shapira (Hebrew: חיים שפירא; born 1962) is an Israeli mathematician, pianist, speaker, philosopher and game theorist. He writes in Hebrew, and his books have been translated into English, Spanish, German, Portuguese, Italian, Russian, Bengali and Korean. He is a lecturer in Israel and was a speaker at TEDxJaffa on game theory and strategy. His first two books in English are Happiness and Other Small Things of Absolute Importance and Gladiators, Pirates and Games of Trust. He also arranged and performed music on the soundtrack for John Wick: Chapter 2.

Shapira was born in Vilnius, Lithuania in 1962 and immigrated to Israel at the age of 14 in 1977.

== Education ==
Shapira's academic journey includes a Bachelor of Science degree in Theoretical Mathematics from the School of Mathematical and Computer Sciences at Tel Aviv University, which he completed in 1983 to 1987. Subsequently, he pursued a Master of Science degree in Probability and Statistics, spanning from 1987 to 1991. Shapira's educational pursuits culminated in two distinct PhDs: the first in Mathematical Genetics, obtained in 1995, with his dissertation titled "The 'Volunteer's Dilemma' as a Generalized War of Attrition," which was published in 1996. His second doctorate was in the field of Science Education, also from Tel Aviv University, where his research centered on the development of intuition related to the concept of infinity in various mathematical contexts. These academic achievements show his dual expertise in mathematics and science education.

== Current position ==
Shapira was a lecturer at Tel Aviv University from 1994 to 2000.

He is at present a senior lecturer at The College of Management Academic Studies in Rishon LeZion, Israel. He is Head of the Excellent Students Program and lecturer at the School of Economics and at the School of Behavioral Sciences.

His main research areas are game theory and philosophy. In 2016, he taught game theory and statistics.

== Publications ==
=== Books in Hebrew ===
- 2006 Following Alice – Travels in the world of Lewis Carroll, The Broadcast University Press, Ministry of Defense
- 2008 Conversations on Game Theory, Kinneret, Zmora‐Bitan
- 2009 Things That Matter, Kinneret, Zmora‐Bitan
- 2010 The Infinite: Never-ending journey, Kinneret, Zmora‐Bitan
- 2011 Ecclesiastes – The Biblical Philosopher, Kinneret, Zmora‐Bitan
- 2013 Nocturnal Musings: Kierkegaard, Schopenhauer, Nietzsche, Kinneret, Zmora‐Bitan
- 2014 The Book of Love, Kinneret, Zmora‐Bitan
- 2015 I think, therefore I err, Kinneret, Zmora‐Bitan

=== Books in English ===
- 2016 Happiness and Other Small Things of Absolute Importance, Watkins Publishing
- 2017 Gladiators, Pirates and Games of Trust: How Game Theory, Strategy and Probability Rule Our Lives, Watkins Publishing
- 2019 Eight Lessons on Infinity: A Mathematical Adventure, Watkins Publishing
- 2023 Notes on the Art of Life, Watkins Publishing
