= Tunnel du Bois Clair =

Disused railway tunnel in France

Coordinates: 46.3859°N 4.6782°E

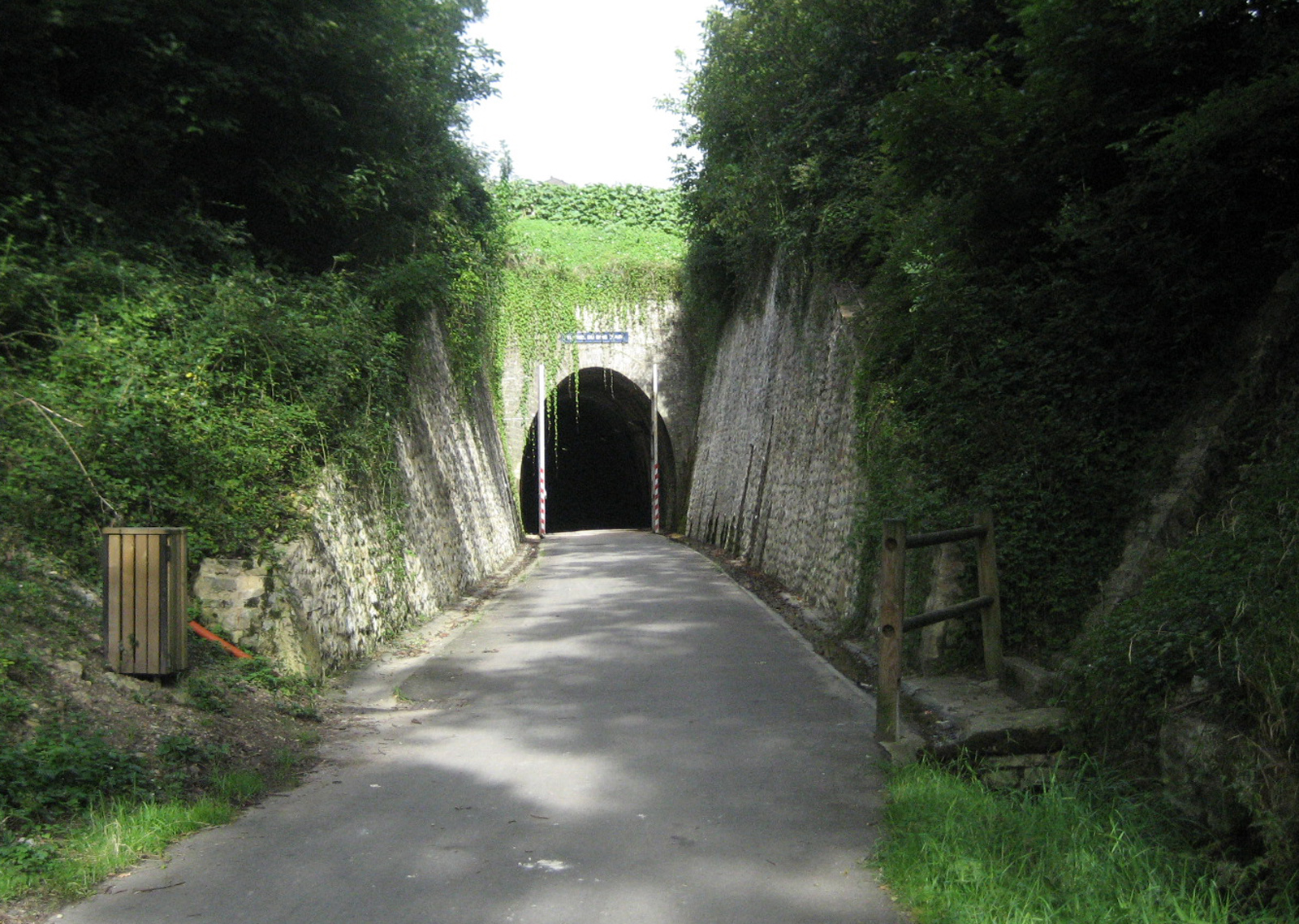
The Tunnel du Bois Clair

The tunnel du Bois Clair is a 1.6 km (0.99 mi) former railway tunnel near Cluny, France repurposed as a shared-use tunnel (i.e. bike and footpath). It is part of the voie verte (cycle path / greenway), the Voie Verte de Bourgogne du Sud. It was the longest cycling tunnel in Europe until Fyllingsdalstunellen in Norway (2.9 km) opened in 2023.

The tunnel is closed during the winter months (mid-October through the end of March) to protect a colony of bats that live in the tunnel. The tunnel takes about 7 minutes to travel through by bike and around 20 minutes by foot.
