= Tunnel de l'Étoile =

Bicycle tunnel under the Place Charles-de-Gaulle, Paris, France

Coordinates: 48°52′23″N 2°17′52″E

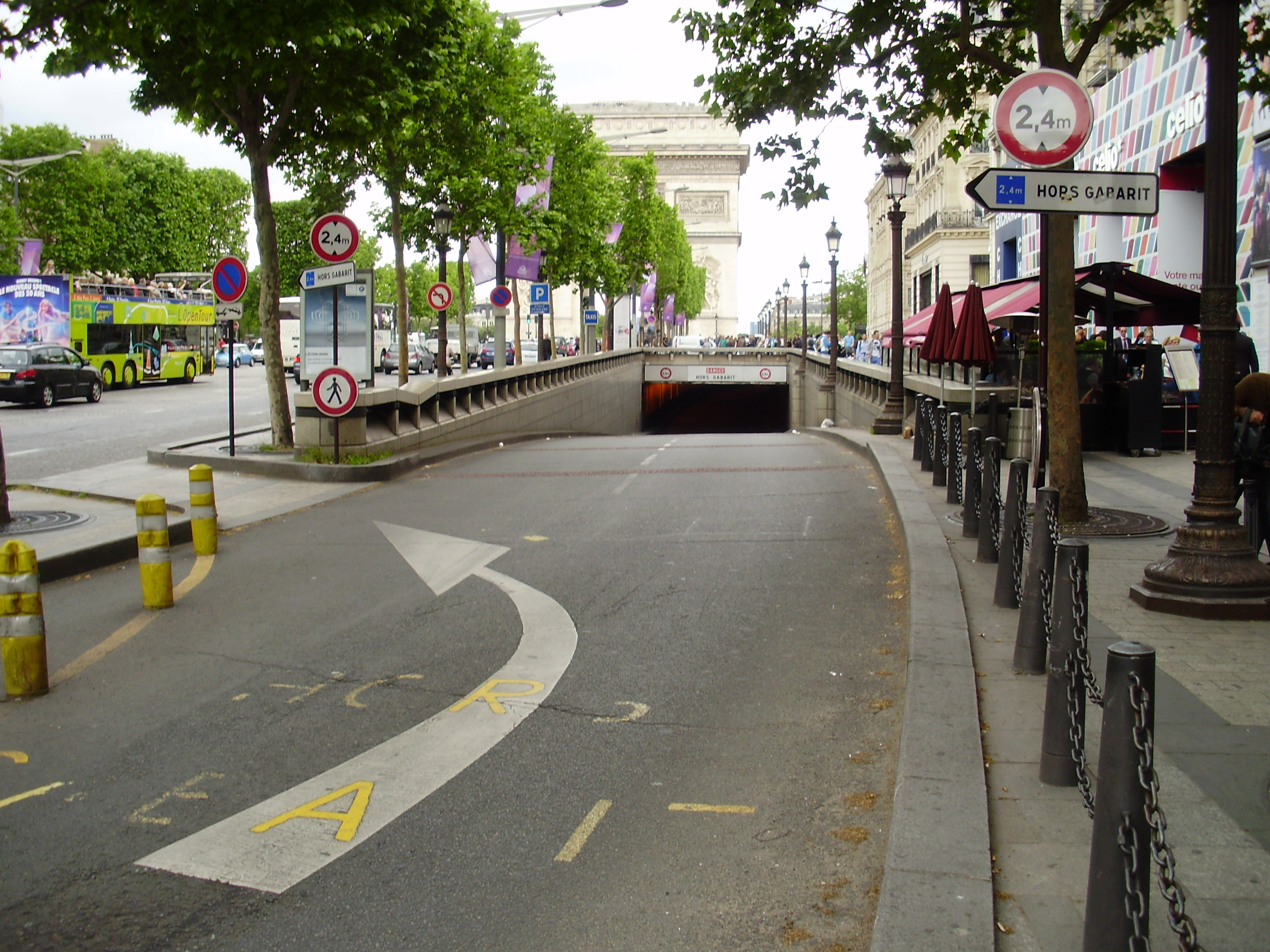
Entrance to the Tunnel de l'Étoile in 2012

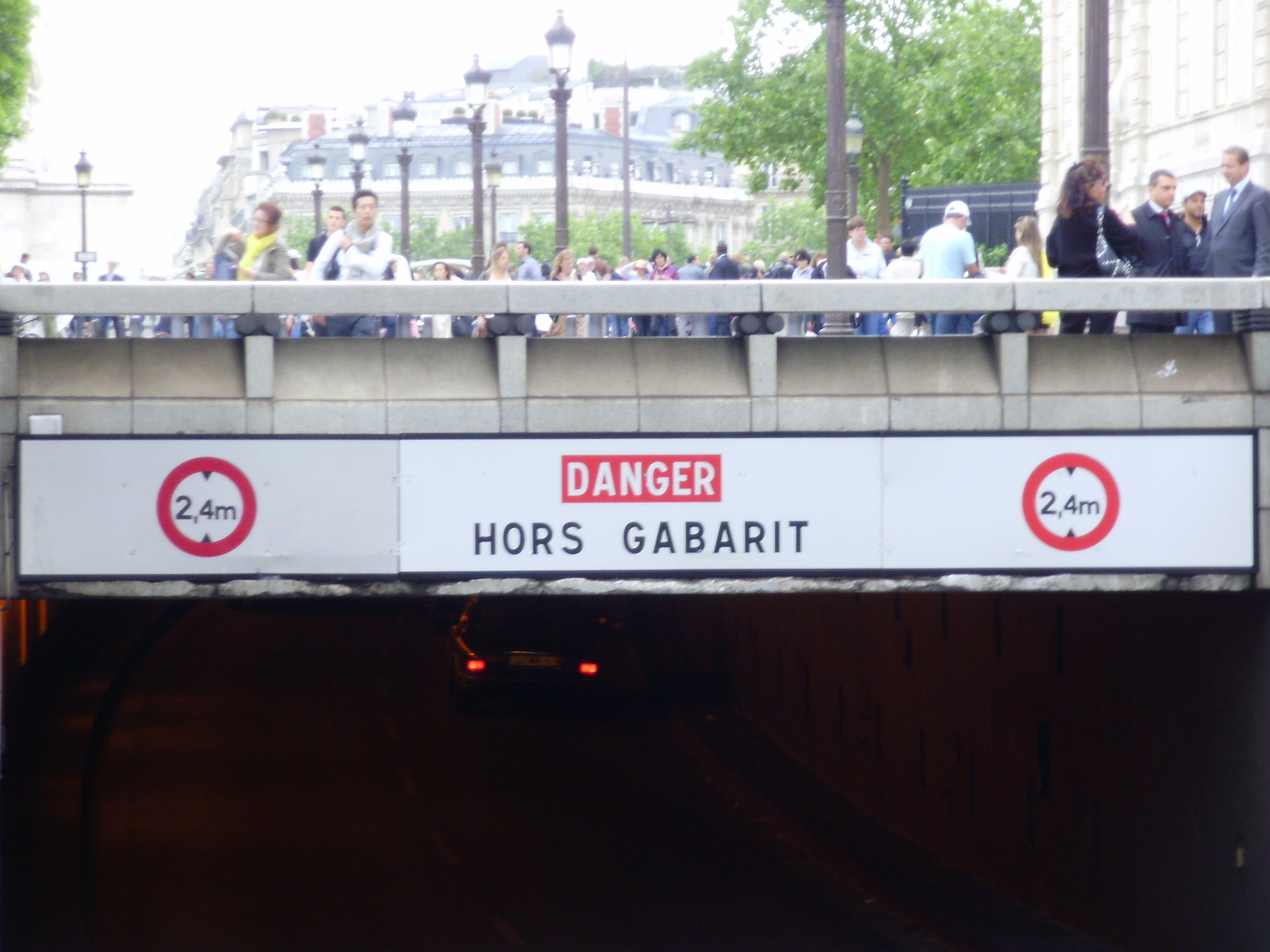
Height warning

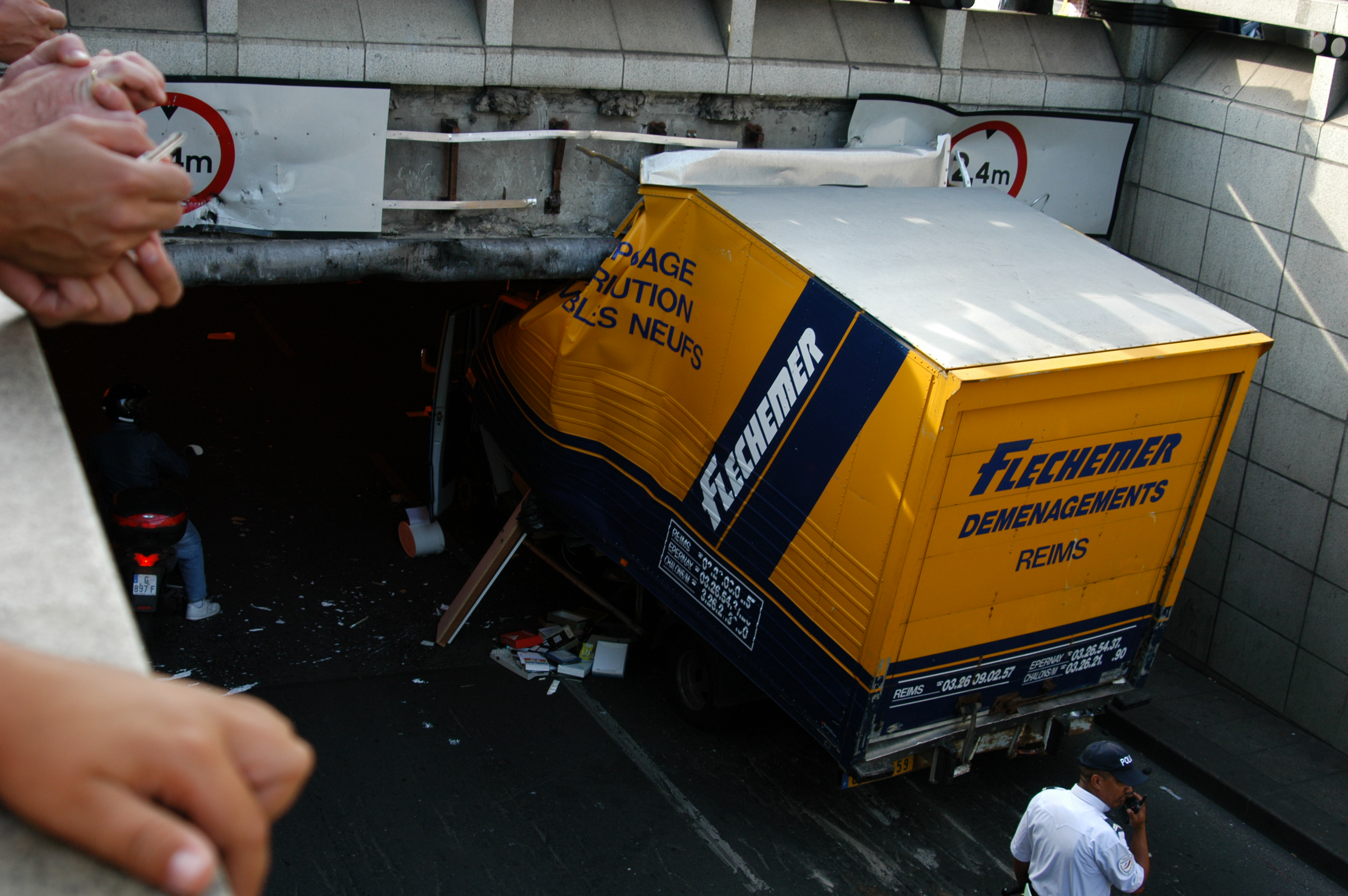
Truck crash in 2006

The Tunnel de l'Étoile is a tunnel in Paris. In the past it was a road tunnel, but since 2020 it is a bicycle tunnel. It links the Avenue des Champs-Élysées to the Avenue de la Grande Armée, passing underneath the Place Charles de Gaulle and the Arc de Triomphe. It is around 400 metres long.

== History ==
While being a road tunnel, it had two one way lanes.

Its entrance has been the site of many road traffic accidents by trucks. In effect the tunnel has a height of 2.4 metres (7 ft 10 in), which was only signalled by a sign hanging above the entrance. Trucks are too high and hit the tunnel roof. No portico can be built on the surface since it would affect the appearance of the Arc de Triomphe and breach the Arc's listing statute. In 2009 an accident occurred there every two weeks.

In March 2015, the tunnel was "temporarily" closed, but it never reopened for motorized traffic.

In May 2020, the tunnel reopened as a bicycle tunnel.
