= Kerem Tunnel =

Tunnel in southwest Jerusalem, Israel

Coordinates: 31.76620705°N 35.15802771°E

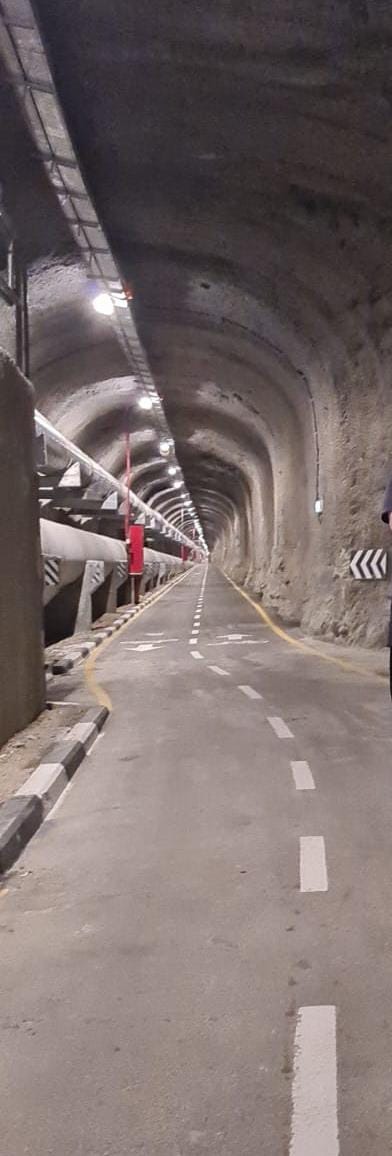
Kerem Tunnel

Kerem Tunnel (Hebrew: מנהרת כרם, Minheret Kerem) is a cycling tunnel in southwest Jerusalem, Israel. It is currently the only one in Israel.

The tunnel was originally built as a utility tunnel in the 1990s by Hagihon (Jerusalem's water company) to run a sewage pipe from the city's southwestern neighborhoods to the Sorek stream sewage treatment plant. The tunnel is 2.1 kilometers long and 3 meter wide.

In 2018 the tunnel was officially declared part of the Jerusalem Ring Path, a 42-kilometer cycling route, connecting the path between the valley of Rephaim and the valley of Motza.

The Tunnel's southern entrance is in the Rephaim Park, below Ein Lavan, and its northern entrance is in the valley of Ein Kerem, about half a kilometer from the Kerem junction. The tunnel was opened for cyclists in September 2022. During the Gaza war the tunnel was closed between October 7, 2023, until December 5, 2023.

== Opening hours ==
- Summer time: 06:00—19:00
- Winter time: 07:00—16:30

== See also ==
- Cycling in Israel
