= Avi Balashnikov =

Israeli public figure

- אבי בלשניקוב

1st CEO of the Knesset Avi Balashnikov

Personal details
- Born: March 20, 1966 (age 60)

Avraham (Avi) Balashnikov (Hebrew: אברהם (אבי) בלשניקוב; born March 20, 1966) is an Israeli public figure, currently serves as Chairman of The Israel Export Institute and of the College of Management Academic Studies and the representative of the American businessman Ronald Lauder in Israel. Balashnikov previously served as deputy director general of the Israel Export Institute, CEO of the Ministry of Communications, CEO of the Knesset, CEO of the State Comptroller of Israel's office, chairman of commercial television Channel 10 and chairman of the Hadassa Hospitals in Jerusalem.

== Biography ==
Balashnikov is a widower and a father of four children. He lives in Jerusalem. He graduated from the University of Haifa.

== Political career and civil service ==
Balashnikov began his public career in 1988 as the parliament assistant of MK Shimon Shetreet. In the 1990s, he served as advisor to the Minister of Finance Avraham "Bayge" Shochat. After Benjamin Netanyahu established his administration in 1996, Balashnikov moved on to head the office of the Minister of Public Security.

In 1999, he joined the businesswoman Pnina Rosenblum and ran with her in the elections to the 15th Knesset as no. 2 in her independent party. The party failed to cross the electoral threshold. At the same year, he started working with the Minister of Environmental Protection, Dalia Itzik, as her senior advisor

In 2002, Balashnikov became a senior advisor and the head of the minister office of trade and industry, all while serving as a member of the investment center’s administration of the state. During this year, Balashnikov became deputy director general of the Israel Export Institute. In 2005, Balashnikov appointed to the CEO of the Ministry of Communications and served under four ministers.

On June 7, 2006, Balashnikov was appointed to the CEO of the Knesset. the Israeli parliament. On February 12, 2007, Balashnikov appointed to acting CEO of the Presidential Residence. Balashnikov served, in parallel, in both roles up to the election of Shimon Peres as President.

After the election in 2009, Balashnikov appointed by the Knesset to the CEO of the State Comptroller Office. He resigned his post after two months. Immediately after, Balashnikov was appointed as the Israeli representative of the American businessman Ronald Lauder. In 2012 Balashnikov was appointed as the Channel 10 Chairman of the board, and in 2013 he was appointed also to Chairman of the Hadassa hospitals in Jerusalem. The hospital’s recovery program was signed during his tenure.

Starting from 2014, he also serves as chairman of the board of Hagihon, which is Israel’s largest water and sewage company. In early 2016, he was also appointed as chairman of the board of the Jerusalem Waste Processing enterprise.

From 2014, he has been on the board of the Haifa Technion. Since January 2018, he also serves as chairman of the board of College of Management Academic Studies. In 2018 and 2019, Balashnikov was appointed by the Minister of Education as a member of the Israel Prize committee.
