= Hagihon =

Municipal water provider for Jerusalem

Hagihon Ltd. (Hebrew: הגיחון) is the municipal water and waste water works corporation for the city of Jerusalem, Israel. Since 2010, Hagihon also services the neighboring towns of Mevaseret Zion and Abu Gosh. Hagihon is Israel's largest water and sewage authority with a yearly budget of over 600 million shekels.

Hagihon was founded in 1996 by the municipality of Jerusalem and operates as an independent corporation by the authority of the Water & Sewage Corporations Law. Hagihon became officially independent from the municipality of Jerusalem in 2003. Since 2014, Hagihon's Chairman of the board of is Avi Balashnikov.

Hagihon provides water and sewage services to ~1 million residents of the greater Jerusalem area including East Jerusalem, Mevaseret Zion and Abu Gosh, spanning 32,500 acres.

Hagihon was one of the first large water works systems to install smart sensors for early detection of leaks.

Hagihon's name is taken from ancient Jerusalem's main water source, the Gihon Spring.

== Sorek wastewater plant ==
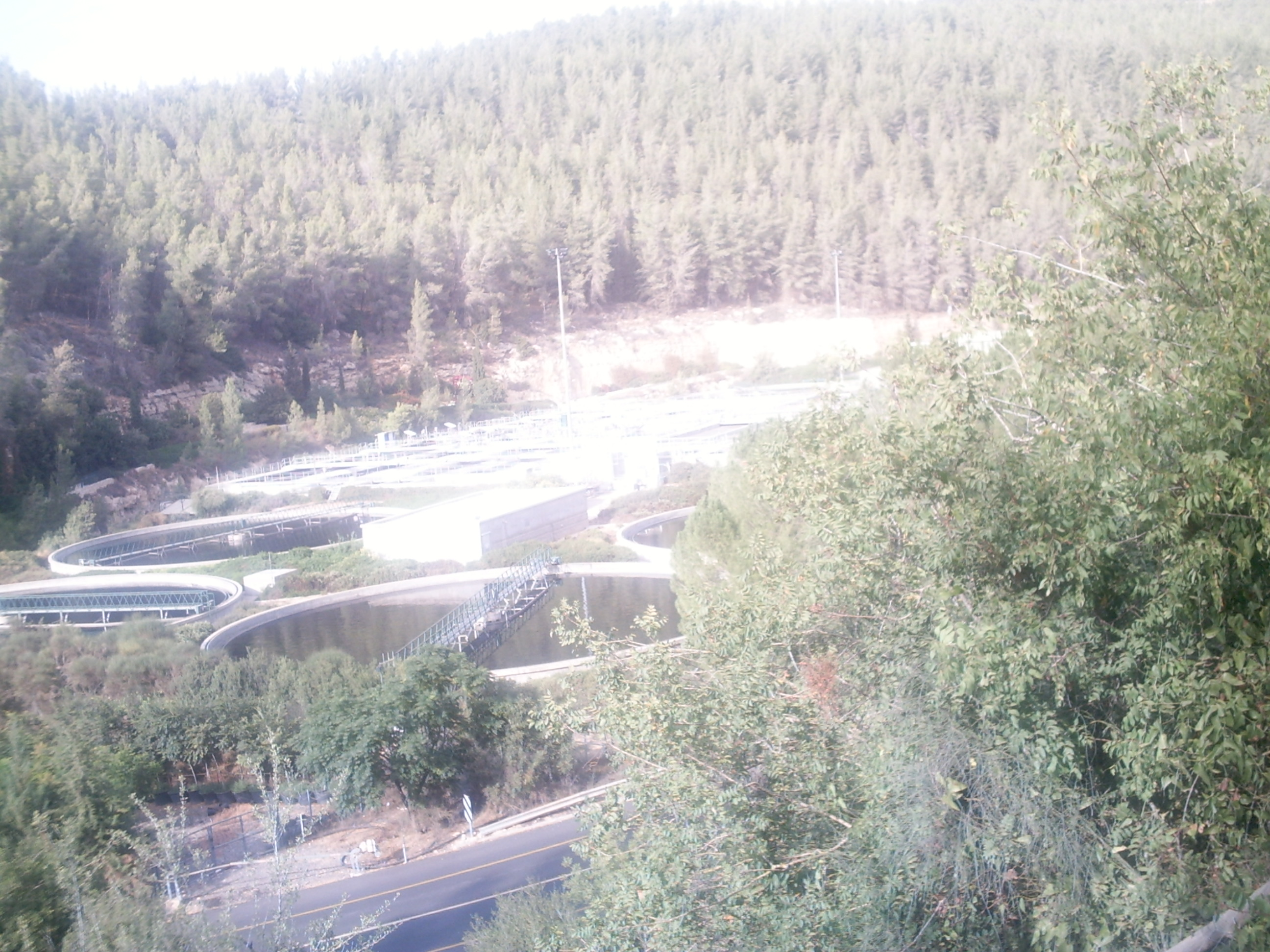
Sorek wastewater plant

Through its daughter company MAVTI (the Jerusalem Company for Sewage and Treatment Plants), Hagihon runs three waste treatment plants, the largest being the Sorek-Rephaim sewage treatment plant, inaugurated in 1999. The Sorek plant is the third largest wase water treatment plant in Israel and treats over 100,000 Cubic Meters of wastewater per day. Wastewater from the Rephaim sewage basin is directed to the Sorek basin through the Kerem tunnel under Mount Ora. From the Sorek basin, the water is carried to the Sorek treatment plant. At the Sorek plant waste water is treated using the activated sludge method. Organic matter is separated using microorganisms and used to produce methane gas, which supplies 70% of the plant's electricity requirements. The debris remaining from the organic matter are used as a fertilizer. The treated water flows into the Sorek river bed in the area of Kibbutz Tzora, where it is utilized for irrigation.

== 5th water line to Jerusalem ==
A 5th water line to Jerusalem is planned to be completed by Mekorot by the year 2065. To store and regulate water from the 5th line, Hagihon plans to build a water reservoir at the Jerusalem Sacher park with a volume of 25,000 cubic meters. A sports field is planned to be built above the reservoir.

== East Jerusalem ==
In 2014, following severe water supply disruptions, residents of the East Jerusalem neighborhoods situated behind the separation barrier, Ras Hamis, Ras Shahada, Dahyat a-Salam and the Shu'afat Refugee Camp, petitioned the Israeli supreme court to force Hagihon to restore full water supply to the area. In response, Hagigon spokesman claimed that the rapid growth, lack of proper urban planning and rampant use of unauthorized "pirated" pipes in east Jerusalem have overwhelmed the infrastructure. As of 2018, only ~44% of East Jerusalem residents were connected to the Haghion water network in a regulated and legal fashion. Seasonal flooding due to poor drainage systems is also common across East Jerusalem.

Palestinian civil rights organizations have accused Hagihon of illegally appropriating large water quantities from Palestinians.

Kidron stream restoration

Currently, part of East Jerusalem's and the Palestinian Authority's sewage water flows freely into the Kidron stream causing severe environmental damage in the Judean desert and the Dead sea area. In a rare collaboration with the Palestinian Authority, Hagihon is leading the Kidron stream restoration project with a budget of close to a billion shekels. According to the plan the sewage flow to the stream will be stopped and diverted to a new collection line, through an 8-km long pipe to the Og purification facility. To avoid damage to the natural valley as well as to the Mar Saba Monastery and nearby archeological sites, the route of the sewage line was diverted from the stream itself, through a 60 meter deep, 1.3 km long tunnel. The project also includes the construction of a hydroelectric station to generate green electricity. The purified water will be used for agriculture and irrigation of palm groves in the Jordan Valley and the Palestinian Authority.
