= Yoram Rabin =

Israeli law scholar (born 1967)

- יורם רבין
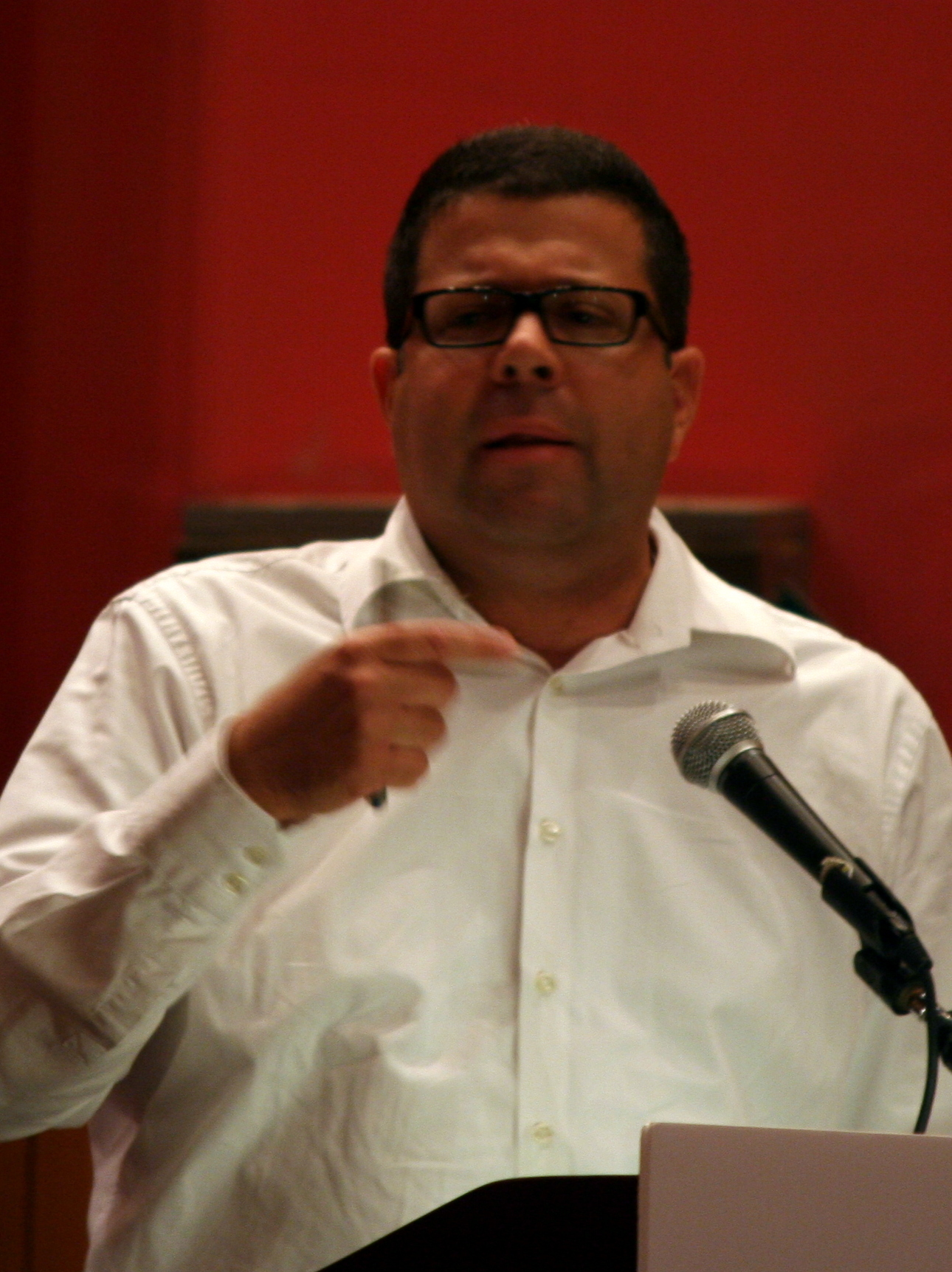
- Born: August 19, 1967 (age 59); Kibbutz Na'an, Israel
- Education: College of Management Law School (LLB); Tel Aviv University (LLM, JSD)
- Occupations: Legal scholar, academic administrator
- Employer: College of Management Academic Studies
- Title: President of the College of Management

Yoram Rabin (Hebrew: יורם רבין; born August 19, 1967) is an Israeli legal scholar. He is a full professor and president of the College of Management in Israel, the country's first and largest private college. Rabin has written and edited several books on public law, human rights and criminal law. He is one of the founding members of the Movement for Freedom of Information in Israel.

== Biography ==
Rabin was born in Kibbutz Na'an, part of the third generation to kibbutz founders. He graduated Giv'at Brenner high school in 1985 and served in the IDF as a Military Police investigation officer from 1985 to 1990. He is a reserve service court-martial judge with the rank of major.

Rabin obtained his LLB from the College of Management Law School (1995). He worked as a lawyer in the Yuval Levy & Co. law firm in Tel Aviv from 1995 to 1997. Shortly after that he attended Tel-Aviv University, earning his LL.M. degree in 1997 and JSD (doctorate) degree in 2002. His LL.M. thesis focused on the constitutional right of access to courts. His JSD thesis focused on the constitutional right to education. Both were supervised by Daphne Barak-Erez, and the two dissertations were published as books in 1997 and 2002.

He was editor of Hamishpat Law Review (2005) and the Hapraklit Law Review (The Israeli Bar Law Review) (2005–2015). In 2008 Rabin, together with Yaniv Vaki published a textbook on criminal law. A second edition of the book's two volumes was published in 2009 and the third edition, adding a third volume, was published in 2014.

Rabin served as dean of the Haim Striks School of Law at the College of Management from 2011 to 2015.

His main teaching and research fields are criminal law; administrative law; constitutional law; economic, social and cultural rights; and the right to education. His books and articles have been cited in judgments of Israel's Supreme Court.

In October 2015 Rabin was appointed legal adviser of the Israeli State Comptroller. In 2019 after the appointment of State Comptroller Matanyahu Engelman he resigned his post. In October of that year he was appointed as the president of the College of Management.

Yoram Rabin is married and has three children and continues to be a member of kibbutz Na'an.

== Organizations and committees ==
- Member of the committee to appoint the Knesset's legal advisor, 2009.
- Member of the National Committee for Reform of Education ("Dovrat Committee"), 2003–2004.
- Founding member and board member of the Freedom of Information Movement in Israel, 2005–2015.
- Member of the Israeli Association of Public Law since 2003; Secretary of the Association 2006–2009; board member since 2009.

== Publications ==
=== Books ===
- Yoram Rabin, Access to Court as a Constitutional Right (1998) (in Hebrew).
- Yoram Rabin, The Right to Education (2002) (in Hebrew).
- Yoram Rabin & Yaniv Vaki, Criminal Law (first edition 2008, second edition in two volumes 2010, third edition in three volumes 2014) (in Hebrew).

=== Editing books and journals ===
- Yoram Rabin & Yuval Shany (eds.) Economics, Social & Cultural Rights in Israel (Ramot Press – Tel-Aviv University, 2004) (in Hebrew).
- Dror Arad-Ayalon, Yoram Rabin & Yaniv Vaki (eds.) David Weiner Book on Criminal Law and Ethics (The Israel Bar Publishing House, 2009) 766 pages (in Hebrew).
- Co-Editing of Adi Azar Book (with Judge Aharon Barak, Judge Boaz Okon, Dr. Tamar Gidron, Dr. Yigal Marzel, Dr. Nili Karako-Eyal, 2007) (in Hebrew).
- Editor of Hamishpat Law Review (The Haim Stricks Law School Law Review) (Vol. 20, 2005) (in Hebrew).
- Editor of Hapraklit Law Review (The Israeli Bar Law Review); Vol. 48(2); 49(1); 49(2); 50(1); 50(2); 51(1); 52(1); 52(2); 53(1); 53(2) (in Hebrew)

=== Selected articles ===
- Arnon Gutfeld & Yoram Rabin, The Judicial Review Controversy: Marbury v. Madison and Its Manifestations in the Israeli Constitutional Revolution, 45 Israel Yearbook on Human Rights 191 (2015).
- Asaf Meydani & Yoram Rabin, Israel: Public Law, Encyclopedia of Public Administration and Public Policy (3rd Edition, Melvin Dubnick & Domonic Bearfield editors, 2015).
- Giora Rahav, Yoram Rabin & Eppi Yuchtman-Yaar, Disparities between Jews and Arabs in the Israeli Criminal Justice System, 13 Ohio State Journal of Criminal Law 233 (2015).
- Roy Peled & Yoram Rabin, The Constitutional Right to Information, 42 Columbia Human Rights Law Review 357 (2011).
- Yoram Rabin & Yuval Shany, The Case for Judicial Review over Social Rights: Israeli Perspectives, 14 Israel Affaires 681 (2008).
- Yoram Rabin & Roy Peled, Transfer of Sovereignty over Populated Territories from Israel to a Palestinian State: The International Law Perspective, 17 Minnesota Journal of International Law 59 (2008).
- Yoram Rabin & Arnon Gutfeld, Marbury v. Madison and its Impact on the Israeli Constitutional Law, 15 University of Miami International and Comparative Law Review 303 (2007).
- Yoram Rabin, The Many Faces of the Right to Education, Exploring Social Rights – Between Theory and Practice 265 (Daphne Barak-Erez & Aeyal Gross Editors, Hart Publishing, Oxford, 2007).
- Yoram Rabin & Roy Peled, Between FOI Law and FOI Culture: The Israeli Experience, 1 (Issue 2) Open Government: Journal on Freedom of Information 41 (2005).
- Yoram Rabin & Yuval Shany, The Israeli Unfinished Constitutional Revolution: Has the Time Come for Protecting Economic and Social Rights?, 37 Israel Law Review 299 (2003–2004).
