= Pnina Rosenblum =

Israeli businesswoman, model, and politician

- פנינה רוזנבלום
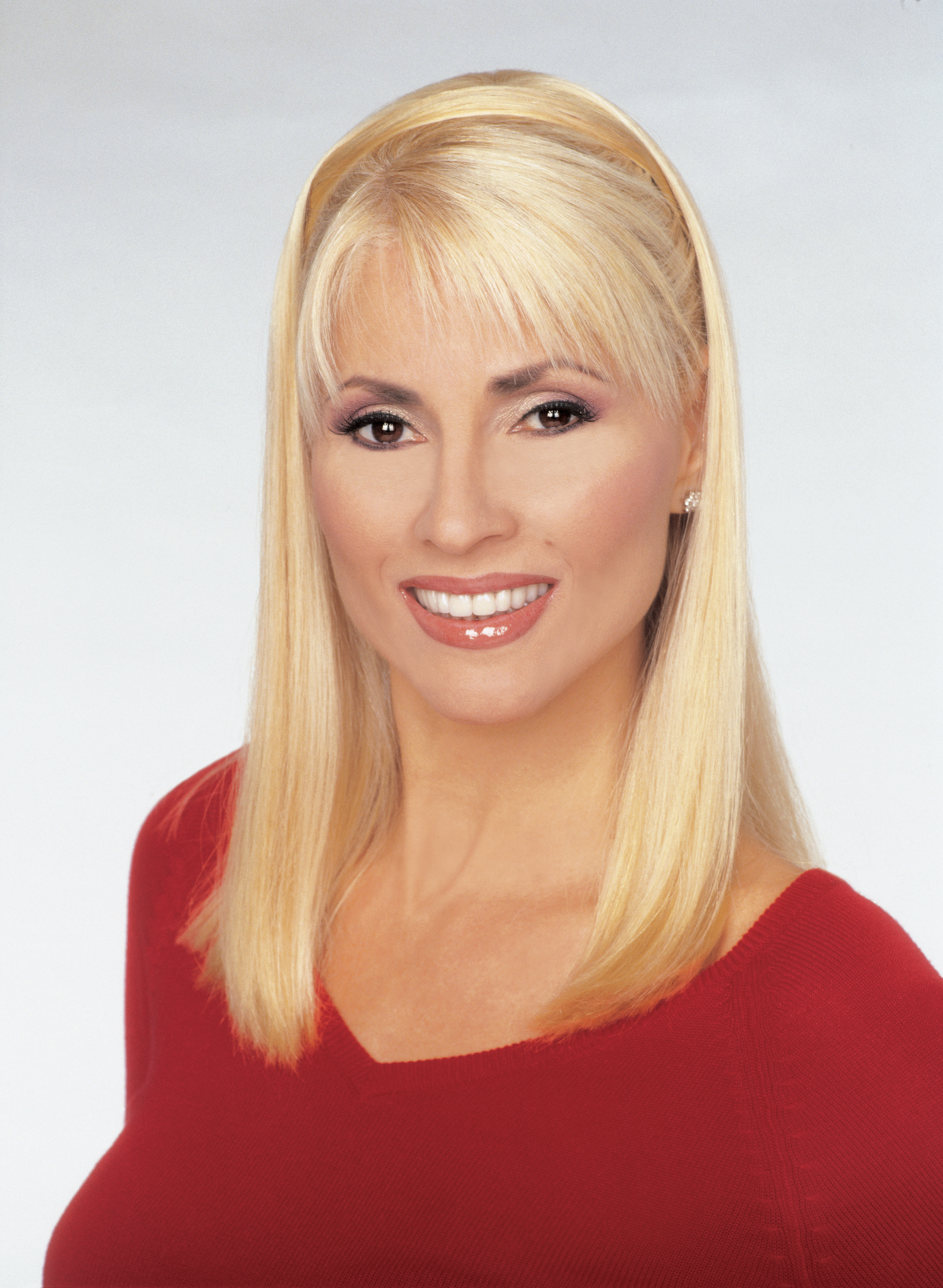

Faction represented in the Knesset
- 2005–2006: Likud

Personal details
- Born: Pnina Rosenblum; 30 December 1954 (age 71) Petah Tikva, Israel

Pnina Rosenblum (Hebrew: פנינה רוזנבלום; born 30 December 1954) is an Israeli businesswoman, model, media personality, and a former politician. She is a former member of the Knesset, the Israeli parliament, for Likud from 2005 to 2006.

== Biography ==
Pnina Rosenblum was born in Petah Tikva, Israel, to immigrant parents; an Ashkenazi Jewish father from Germany and a mother from Iraq. She served for seven months in military bands of the Israel Defense Forces.

== Modeling, acting and singing career ==
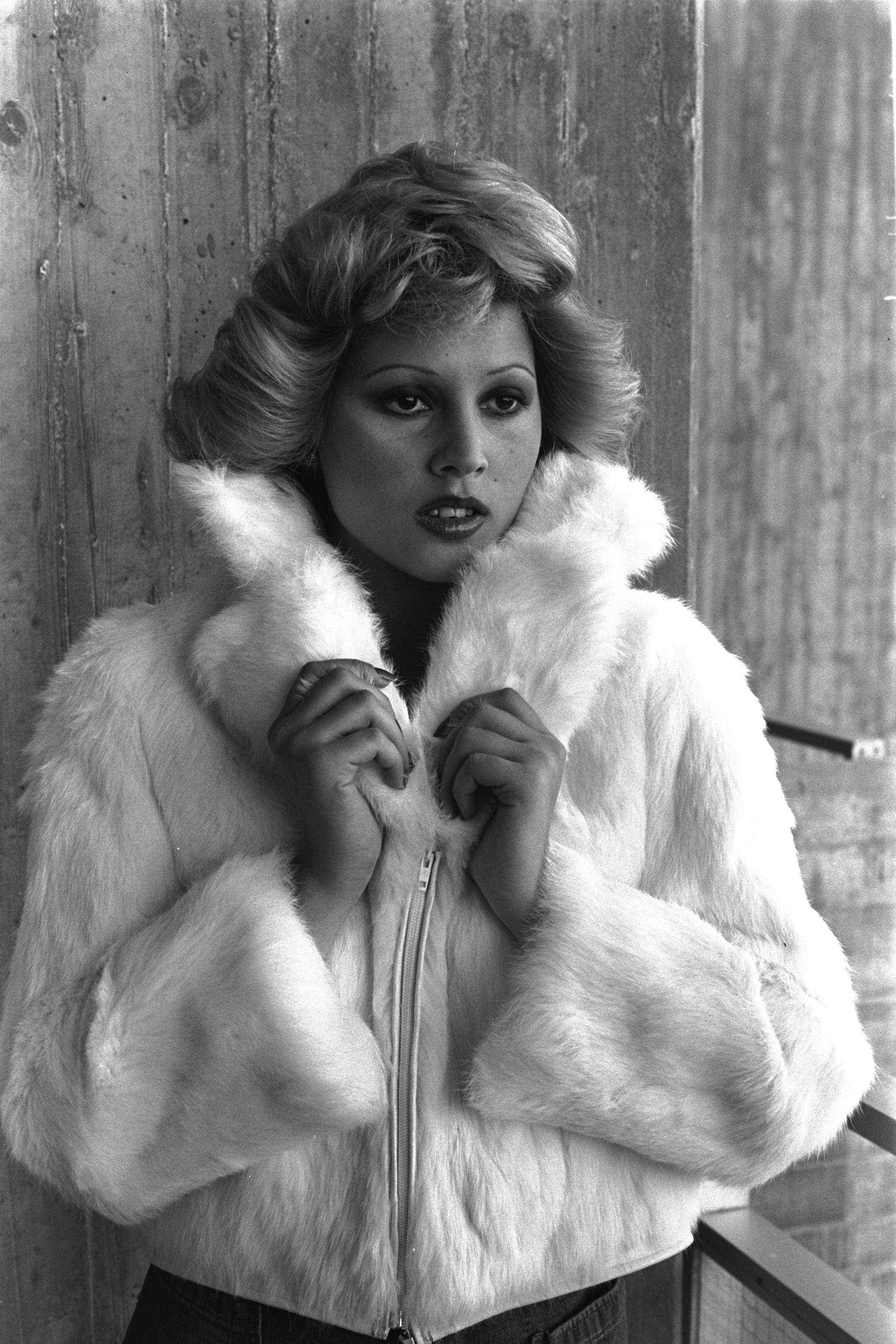
Rosenblum at the Israel Fashion Week in 1973

Rosenblum was an actress and fashion model, known to foreign media in her youth as Pnina Golan. She appeared in the Israeli films Kasach (1984), Am Yisrael Hai (1981), Lo LeShidur (1981), Diamante Lobo (1976), and Malkat HaKvish (1971).

She debuted as a singer in 1983, in a bid to represent Israel in the Eurovision Song Contest. Her entry, Tamid Isha ("Always a Woman") was ranked last, yet gained popularity in Israel.

In 2014, she and her daughter Chen competed as a team on the fourth season of the Israeli version of The Amazing Race, HaMerotz LaMillion. Pnina tripped and fractured her wrist immediately after departing the Starting Line, eliminating them from the competition before they even had a chance to leave Israel.

== Political career ==
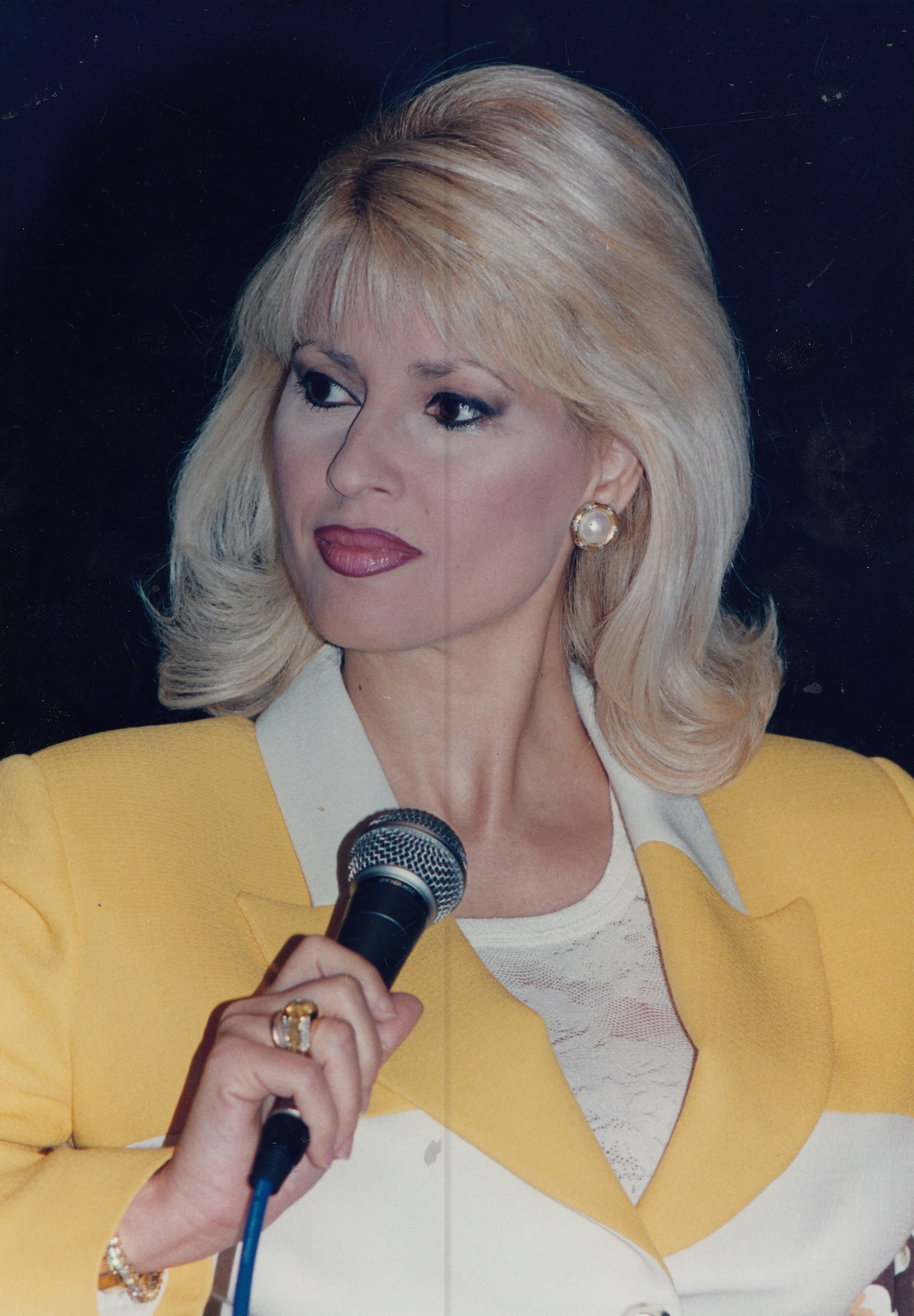
Pnina Rosenblum

In 1999, she formed an independent list named after herself, together with Avi Balashnikov, in order to run in the 1999 Knesset elections. Her party did not pass the electoral threshold of 1.5%, although her party became the largest without representation. The party dissolved soon afterwards.

Rosenblum later joined the Likud party, and on 10 December 2005 entered the Knesset after the defection of several Likud MKs to Kadima opened up spaces for new Likud members. However, she lost her seat four months later in the March 2006 elections. In 2009 the Likud placed her at the unrealistic 46th place.

== Business career ==
In 1989, she founded her own cosmetics company, Pnina Rosenblum Ltd.

== Personal life ==
In the 1992 she married Moshe Haim, with whom she adopted a daughter and a son from orphanages in Russia and in Romania, respectively. Haim and Rosenblum got divorced, re-married, and then got divorced again.

In 2004, she married Israeli businessman Ronny Simanovich, father of three from his previous marriage, one of whom is Israeli model Coral Simanovich (Spanish footballer Sergi Roberto's wife).

In 1992 Rosenblum purchased a villa in Ramat Gan. This was publicized as one of the most expensive real estate deals made in the country, and in addition, the parties she hosted at her home gained notoriety. In 2011 she sold her home, and she currently resides in Ramat Aviv.
