= Fyllingsdalstunellen =

Tunnel for pedestrians and cyclists in Bergen, Norway

Coordinates: 60°20′51″N 5°17′37″E

Fyllingsdaltunellen (English: Fyllingsdal Tunnel) is a cycling and pedestrian tunnel through Løvstakken, linking the borough of Fyllingsdalen and the neighborhood of Minde in the Årstad borough of Bergen, Norway. The tunnel opened in spring 2023 and is the world's longest purpose-built cycling tunnel, at 2.9 kilometres (1.8 mi) long. It runs parallel to the Bergen Light Rail tunnel through the same mountain, for which it also functions as an escape tunnel.

== Design ==
The width of the pathway is 6 metres (20 ft). 3.5 m (11 ft) is a bidirectional cycle lane with white asphalt, while the remaining 2.5 m (8.2 ft) is a footpath raised on a kerb.

The tunnel walls are made of slanted concrete blocks to dampen reverberation and echoes.

== Gallery ==
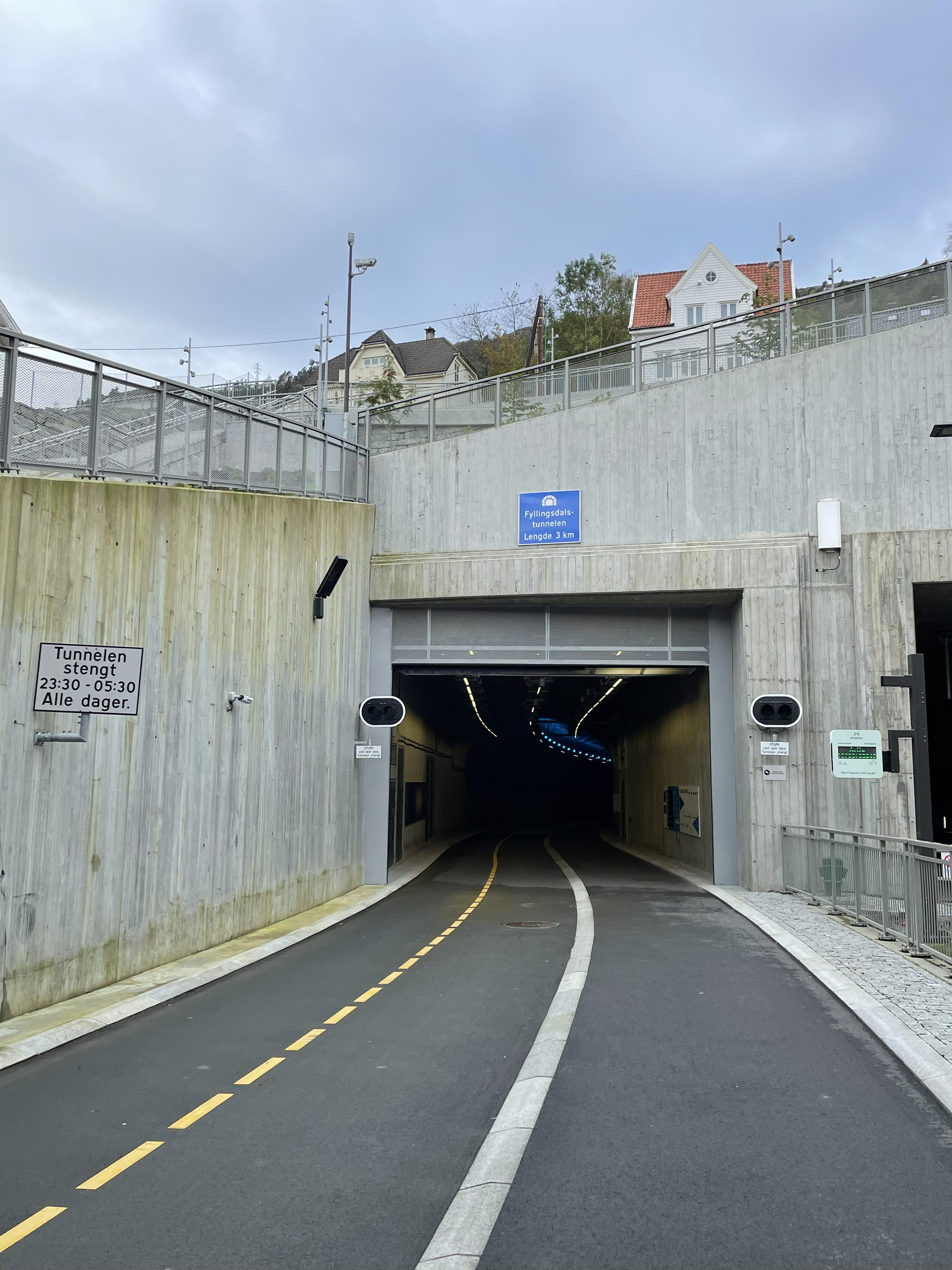
Tunnel opening at Minde

Inside the tunnel

The central rest area

== Security ==
The tunnel is camera monitored, and has emergency lights and telephones. Cellphone coverage and emergency network has been established, as well as access for emergency vehicles.
