= College of Management Academic Studies =

Institute of higher education in Israel

Coordinates: 31.97035°N 34.772104°E

The College of Management Academic Studies
- המסלול האקדמי המכללה למינהל
- Motto: להצלחה יש דרך (hebrew)
- Motto in English: There is a way to success
- Type: Public
- Established: 1978
- Endowment: ₪217.7 million per year
- Chairman: Avi Balashnikov
- President: Prof. Yoram Rabin
- Rector: Prof. Yuval Merin
- Students: 9,000
- Location: Rishon LeZion & Bnei Brak, Israel
- Website: english.colman.ac.il

The College of Management Academic Studies (COLMAN) is a college located in the city of Rishon LeZion, Israel, and is the largest college in the country. Founded in 1978, COLMAN is the first non-subsidized, not-for-profit research academic institution in Israel to be recognized and certified by the Council for Higher Education in Israel. It offers bachelor's and master's degrees in business administration, law, media, economics, design, innovation and entrepreneurship, educational consulting, computer science, behavioural sciences, family studies, and various interdisciplinary programs.

== History ==
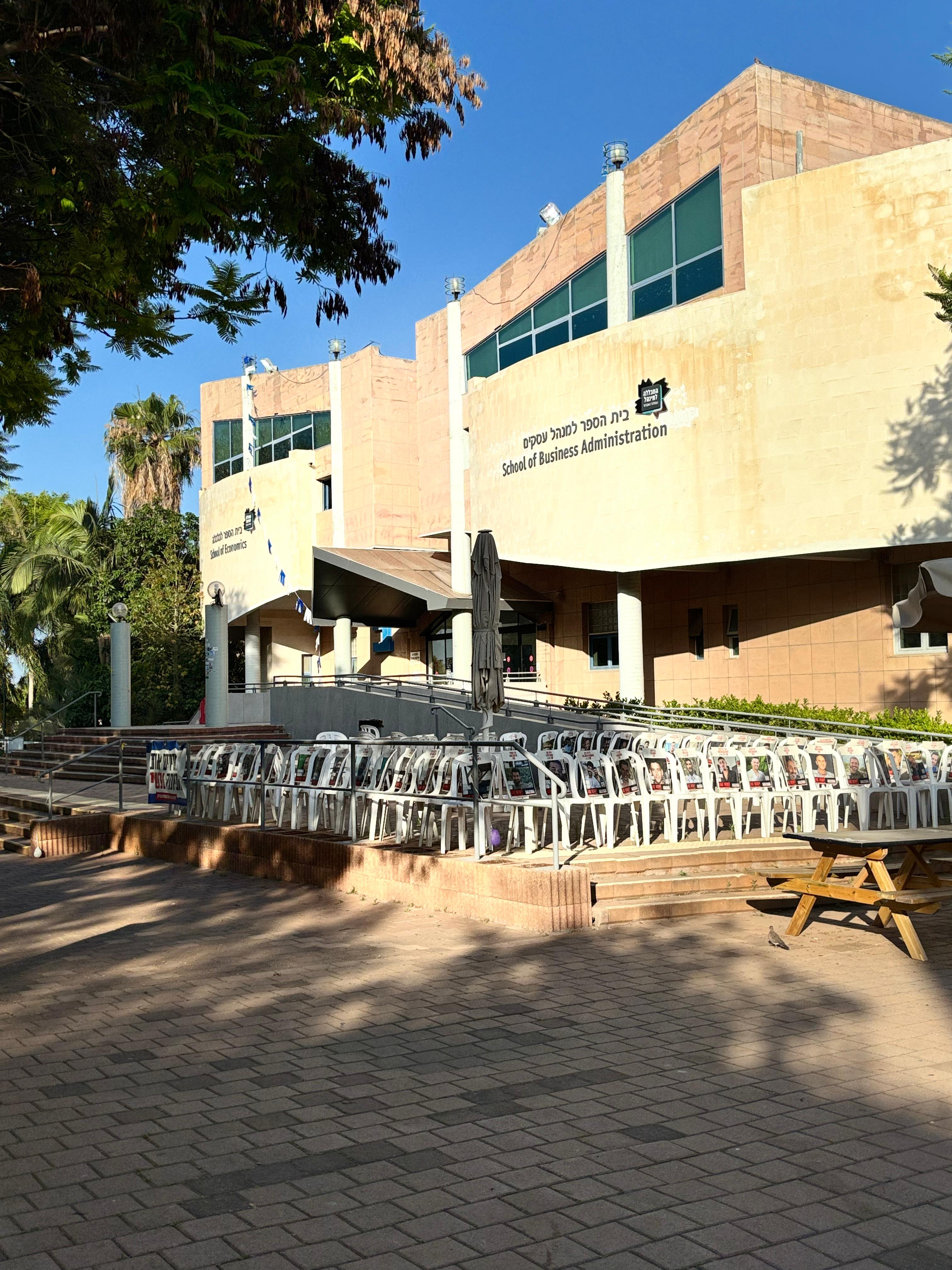
School of Economics

The Seminary for Administration (Midrasha Laminhal) was founded in Tel Aviv in 1962 by the Histadrut trade union to provide for professional training in the fields of administration. In the 1970s, the Seminary changed its name to the College of Management. In 1987, the College of Management received authorization from the Council for Higher Education to conduct academic studies and was the first private academic institution certified in Israel.

In 1992, the academic track separated from the non-academic track, which continues to operate as a separate entity under the name "The College of Management". The academic track, operating as a separate entity, adopted the name "The College of Management Academic Studies."

The College of Management Academic Studies (COLMAN) began operations at the campus in Rishon LeTzion during the 1995–1996 academic year. The campus encompasses an area of approximately 130 dunams and includes: the Faculty of Business and the School of Economics building, the School of Behavioural Sciences, the Department of Psychology and the Faculty of Law building, the School of Design and Innovation building, the School of Media Studies and Faculty of Computer Science building, the library building, and an auditorium. In 2013, COLMAN's ultra-orthodox campus opened in the city of Bnei Brak, Israel.

== Teaching and degrees ==
The Teaching Authority was established to improve the quality of teaching at institutions of higher education in Israel in general, and at COLMAN in particular, through various means, while developing tools to measure quality instruction. It encourages debate on the essence of academic teaching and its quality amongst the faculty and academic management.

The Research Authority aims to encourage research activity among the college schools and academic departments to aid faculty in locating research funds both in Israel and abroad and to prepare grant proposals. The Authority encourages faculty to engage in both basic and applied research as an important element for the improvement of the quality of teaching, a stepping-stone for the personal academic advancement of the faculty, and increasing the prestige of the college in Israel and abroad.

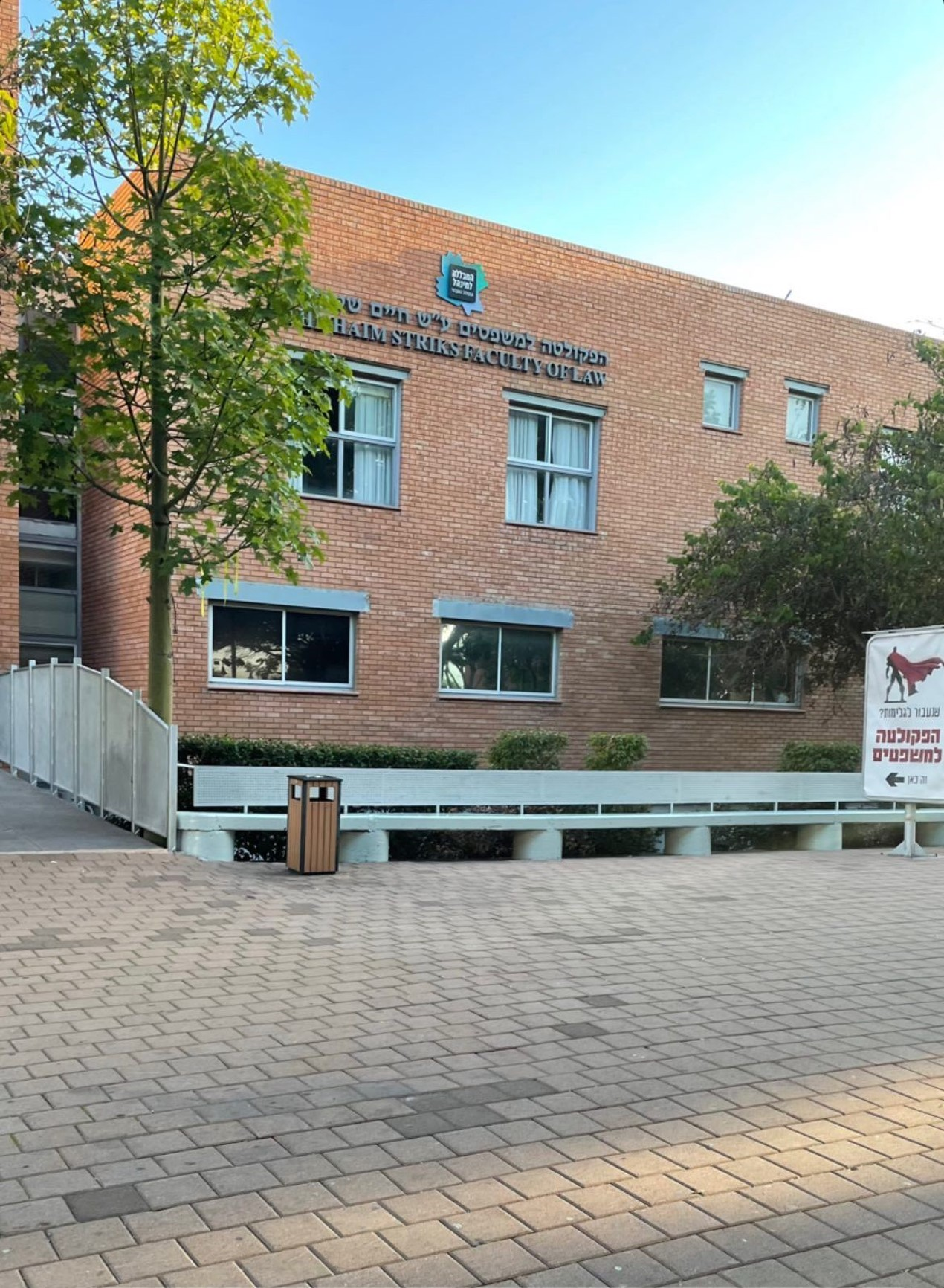
Faculty of Law

== Academic year ==
The academic year is divided into three terms that last from October to January, from February to May, and from June to September.

== Libraries ==
=== Central library ===
The College of Management's central library has been located at the Rishon LeZion campus since 1995. A building dedicated to the library was built and inaugurated in 2010. It covers three floors and includes reading rooms, group work rooms, a Daily Press Room, an audiovisual room, and a teaching class. The library collection contains more than 80,000 volumes of books and copies of electronic media, covering a variety of topics in all of the fields of study in the college's Departments. The collection includes 450 print journals, thousands of electronic journals, 40 databases, and publications of research institutes, newspapers, videotapes, and DVDs.

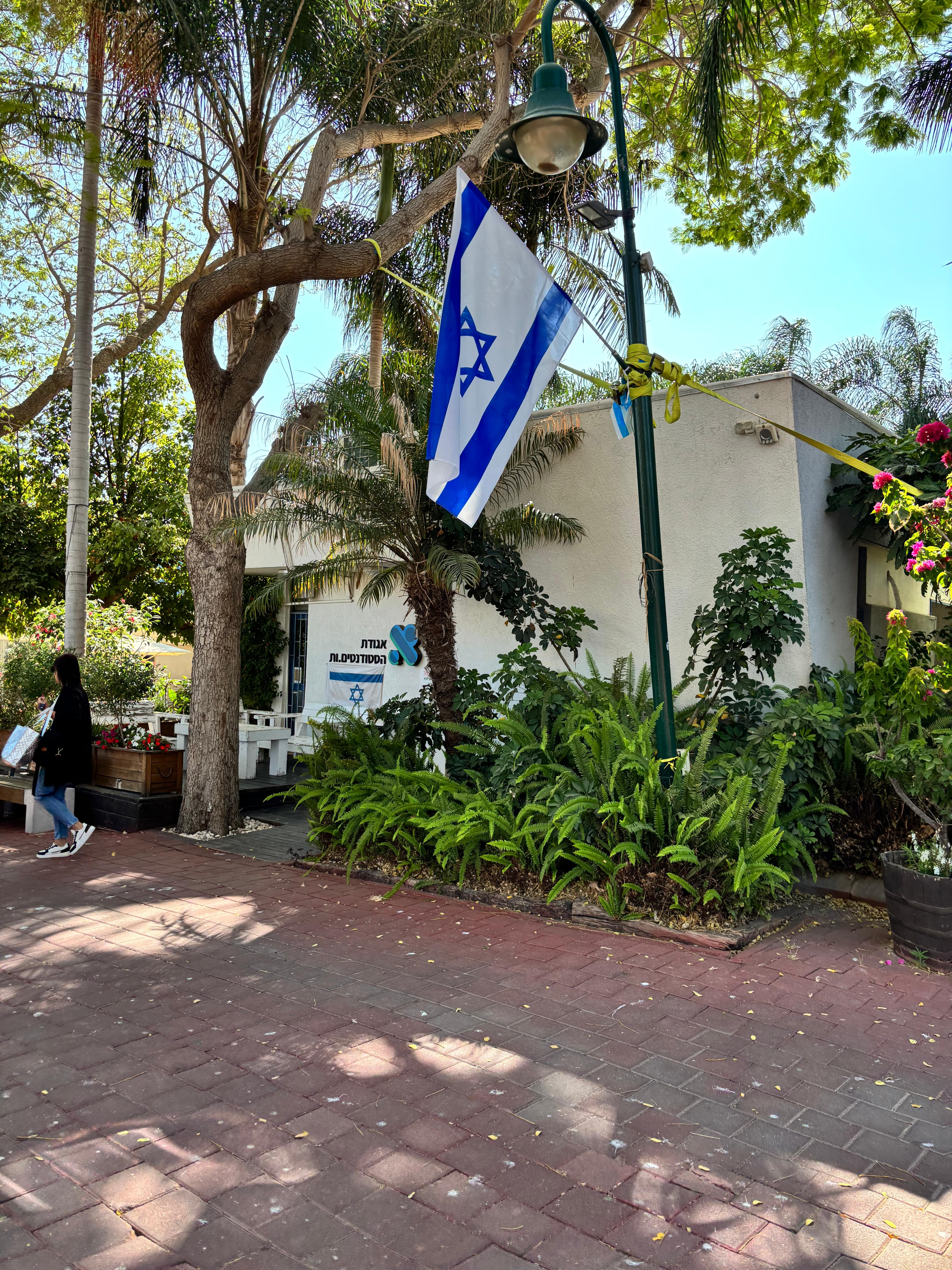
students union building

=== Law library ===
The law library was established in 1990, and moved to a new location in the law school building on the Rishon LeZion campus in 1995. The library contains a comprehensive collection of legislation and case law files from Israel and abroad, law journals, legal series, encyclopedias, dictionaries, and guides.

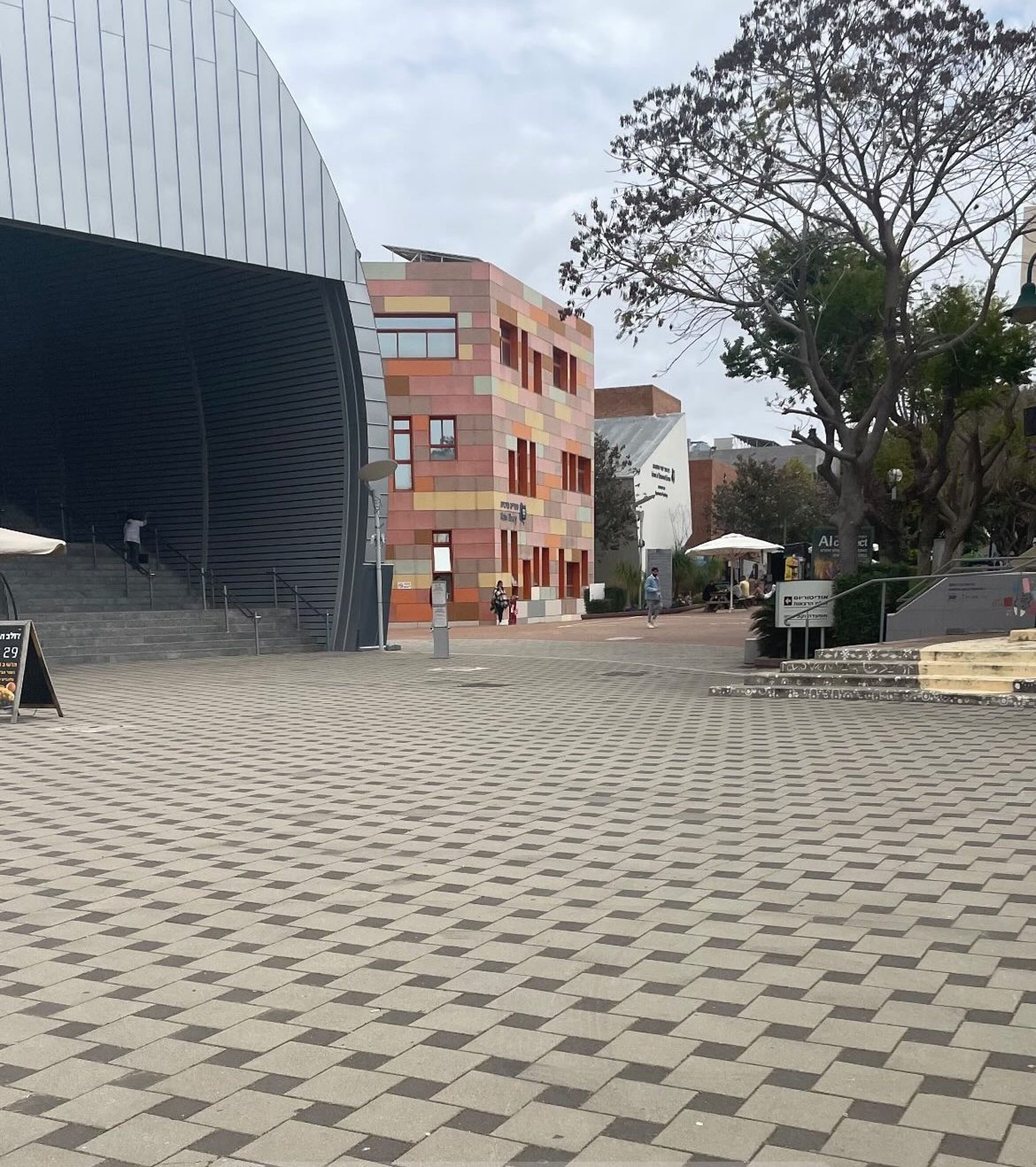
The Central Library

== Faculties and Departments ==
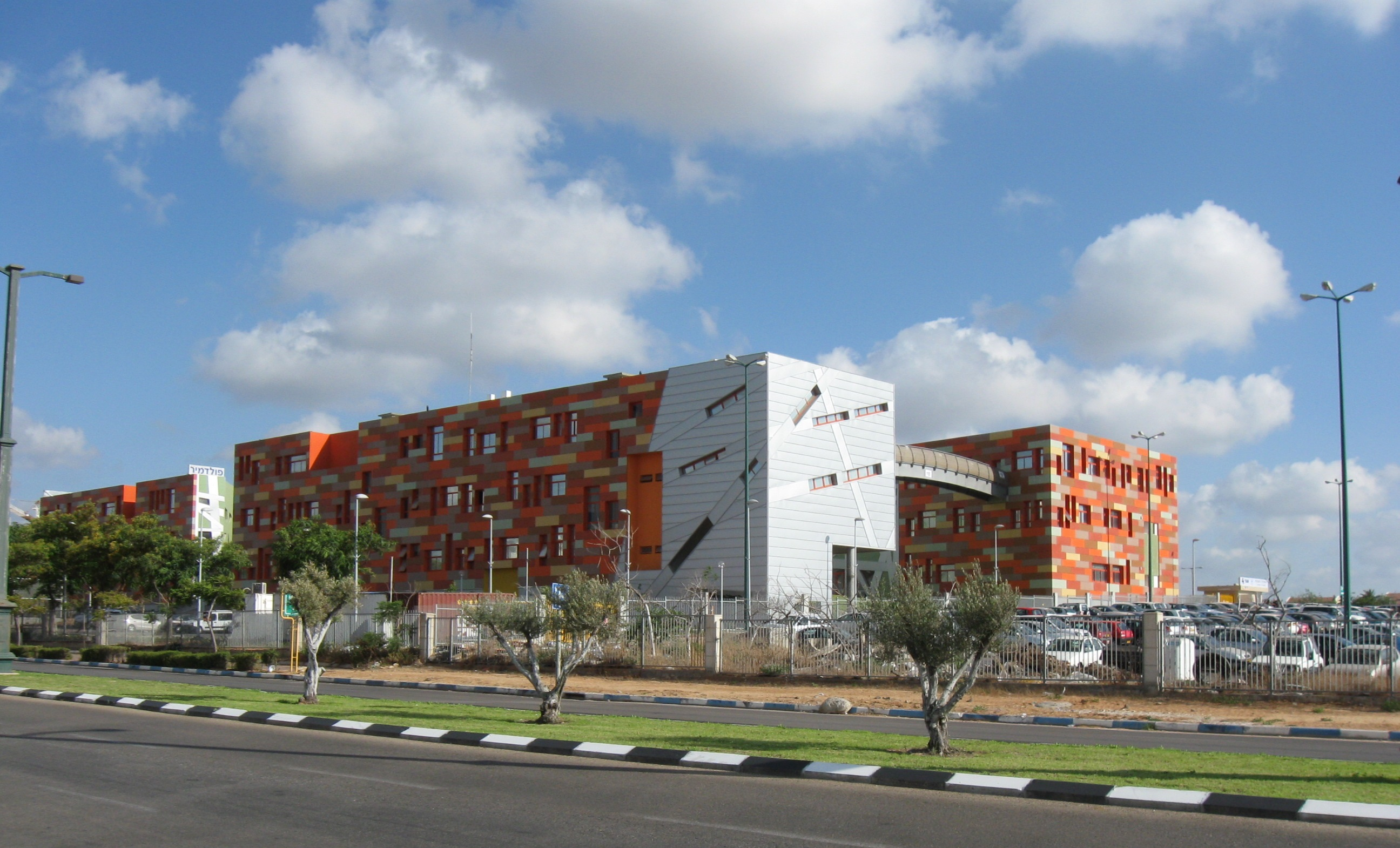
School of Media Studies

Business Administration

The School of Business is the largest in the country, with an enrollment of approximately 3,500 students. It is the first private academic program ever officially accredited by the Council for Higher Education in Israel.

Law

The Haim Striks School of Law was founded by Daniel Friedmann (later a Minister of Justice) in 1990. It offers both a Bachelor's and Master's program in Law. COLMAN's Law School ranked among the highest-ranked law schools in Israel, according to a 2005 report prepared for the Council for Higher Education. It collaborates with leading universities in the United States and England such as Fordham University and University of Oxford.

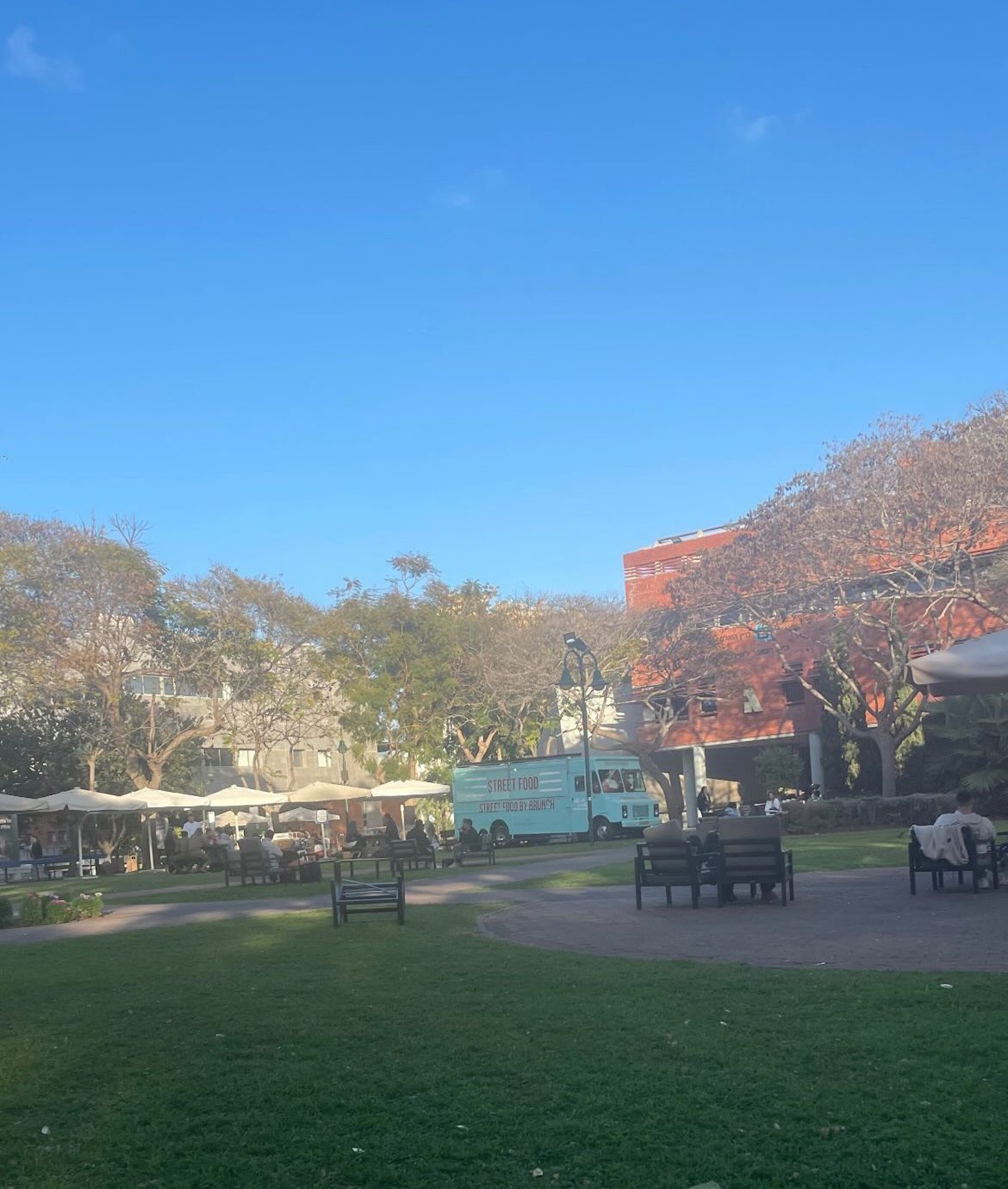
the campus

Media Studies

The School of Media Studies at COLMAN is the largest of its kind in Israel; more than 50% of Israel's students of Media Studies are enrolled at COLMAN. The Bachelor's program in Media Studies and Management integrates theoretical and practical knowledge.

Economics

The School of Economics was established in 1994, and today, it is one of the largest departments in its field in Israel. 1,300 students are enrolled in the Bachelor's in Economics and Management program.

Computer Science

The Department of Computer Science is one of the largest and leading departments in its field in Israel.

Behavioral Sciences

The School of Behavioral Sciences at the College of Management was established in 1994 as a multidisciplinary department for studying psychology, sociology, and anthropology.

Interior Design

The Interior Design Department was founded in 1995 is a full academic track in interior design separate from architecture or design studies.

== Alumni Forum ==
The Alumni Forum was established to serve the college's 31,000 alumni. It aims to maintain the connection between the college and its graduates, to encourage contact between the graduates and to fulfill the needs of the alumni both academically and in the business and employment fields.

== Office of International Programs ==
The College of Management Academic Studies has an international office that works with students from several countries. There is a student club for foreign and Israeli students, on campus known as the International Student Community (ISC).

== See also ==
- List of universities and colleges in Israel
- Education in Israel
