= Jerusalem Trail =

Hiking and cycling path in Israel

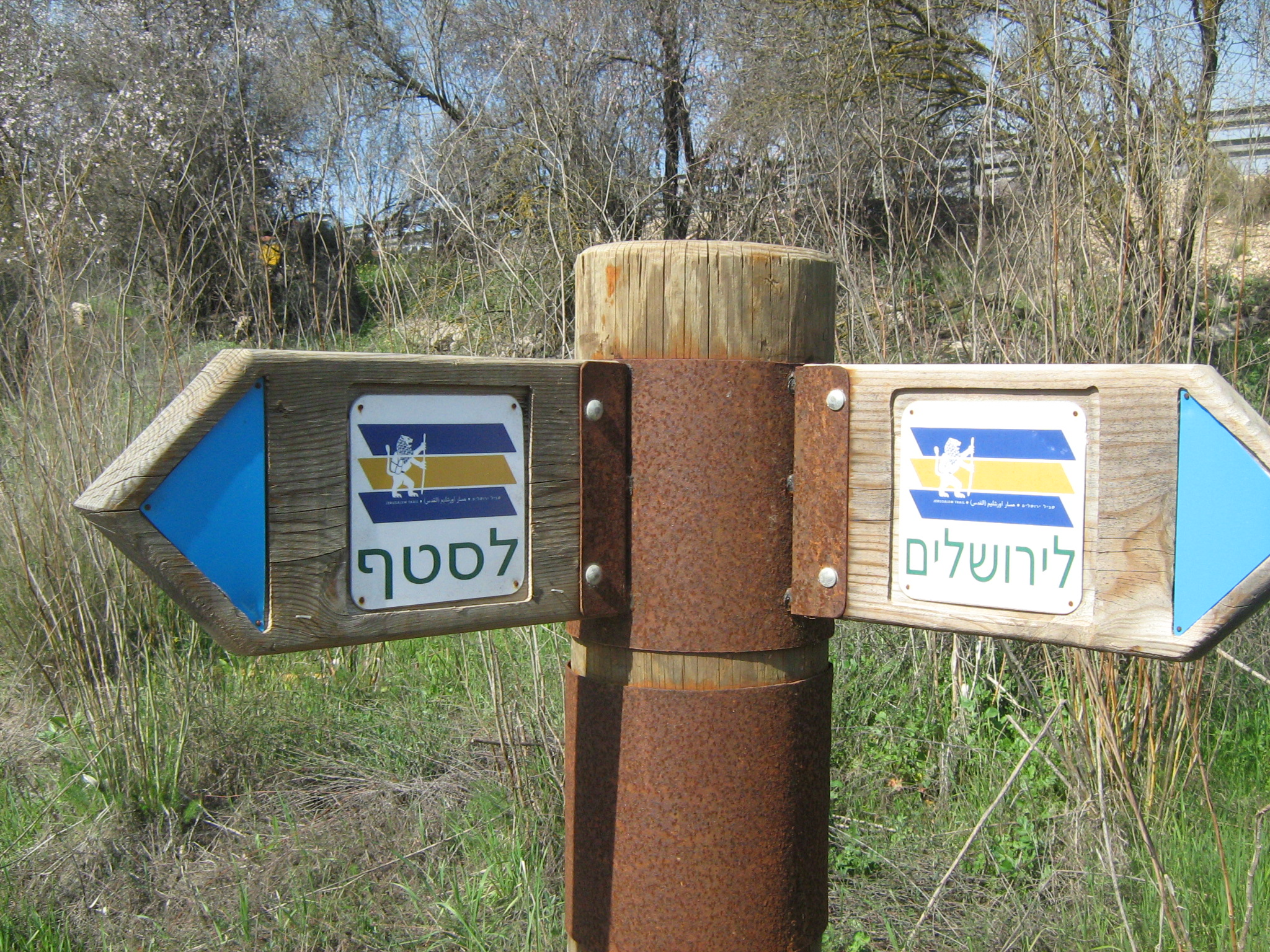
- Jerusalem Trail marker.
- Length: 42 kilometres (26.1 mi)
- Location: Jerusalem, Israel
- Established: 2006
- Trailheads: Sataf, Ein Hindak
- Use: Hiking
- Website: www.jerusalemtrail.com

The Jerusalem Trail, (Hebrew: שביל ירושלים, Shvil Yerushalaim) is a hiking and cycling path that extends the Israel National Trail into Jerusalem.

== Overview ==
The trail, opened to the public in 2006, is almost a complete circuit. It can be extended to a full loop by following Israel National Trail marks. The length is approximately 42 km (26mi).

The trail is marked with a gold line between two blue lines and takes an average of two days to complete.

The trail combines cultural and historical places with national parks around Jerusalem. The trail passes many museums, the Knesset, the City of David, Mahane Yehuda Market, Sataf, and the Hebrew University of Jerusalem.

== See also ==
- Tourism in Israel
- Cycling in Israel
- Kerem Tunnel
- Geography of Israel
- List of long-distance footpaths
- Wildlife in Israel
