= Avenue de la Grande Armée =

Avenue in Paris, France

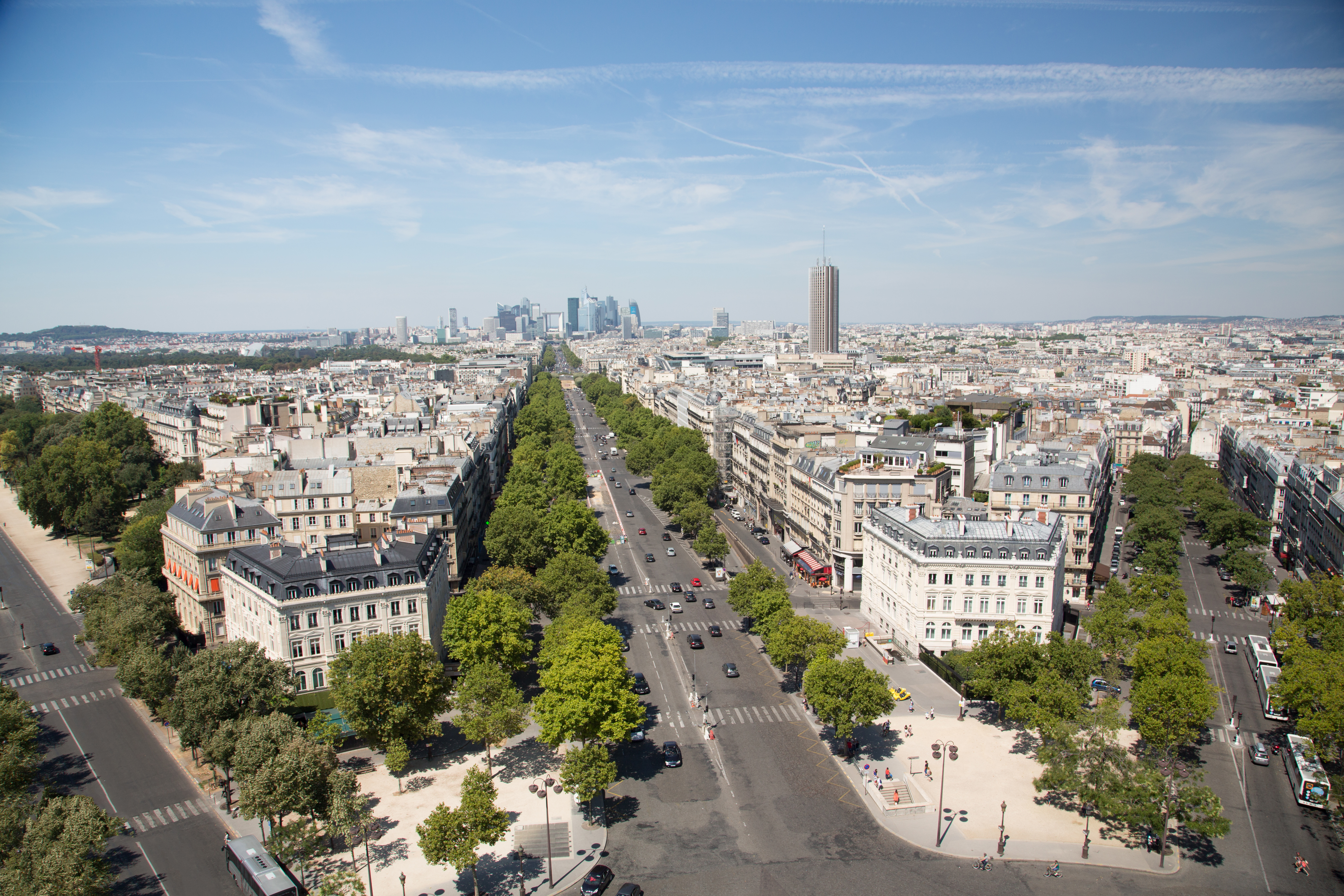
- The Avenue de la Grande Armée seen from the Arc de Triomphe, with La Défense in the background.

- Location within Paris
- Length: 775 m (2,543 ft)
- Width: 70 m (230 ft)
- Arrondissement: 16th, 17th
- Quarter: Chaillot; Ternes
- Coordinates: 48°52′33″N 2°17′19″E
- From: Place Charles de Gaulle
- To: 164, Avenue de Malakoff, 279, Boulevard Pereire

Construction
- Completion: 1826
- Denomination: 2 March 1864

The Avenue de la Grande Armée is an avenue in Paris, France, marking the boundary between its 16th and 17th arrondissements. It was formerly named Avenue de la Porte Maillot as part of Route nationale 13, but was renamed to its present name in 1864 in honour of the Grande Armée of the Napoleonic Wars.

== Geography ==
The avenue begins at the Place Charles de Gaulle and ends in a junction with Avenue de Malakoff and Boulevard Pereire. It is 775 metres long and 70 metres wide. It continues on the same alignment as the Avenue des Champs-Élysées, which is continued by the Avenue Charles-de-Gaulle as far as Neuilly-sur-Seine, towards la Défense. The tunnel de l'Étoile under the Arc de Triomphe directly links the avenue des Champs-Élysées to the Avenue de la Grande Armée.

== Notable businesses ==
The avenue has been occupied by a number of businesses:

- No. 10 was the factory of bicycle and automobile manufacturer Société Parisienne from 1876 to 1903.

The Avenue is currently the home of many bicycle, scooter and motorcycle shops, including dealerships for Harley Davidson and Triumph.
