= Israel Export Institute =

Israeli government agency

- maḥon ha-yitsu ha-yisra'eli מכון היצוא הישראלי

Agency overview
- Formed: 1958
- Agency executives: Avi Balashnikov, Chairman; Nili Shalev, Director
- Parent department: Ministry of Economy

The Israel Export Institute (IEI; Hebrew: מכון היצוא הישראלי, romanized: maḥon ha-yitsu ha-yisra'eli) is an Israeli governmental agency which operates under the Ministry of Economy. The Institute's goal is to promote the export of Israeli products. As of June 2023, the Institute's director general is Nili Shalev, and its Chairman is Mr. Avi Balashnikov.

Established in 1958, the institute is a non-profit organization which exists to promote the export of Israeli products and services in cooperation with the Ministry of Economy, as well as foreign and domestic businesses. The Institute is jointly owned by the Israeli Government, Histadrut, Manufacturers Association of Israel and Federation of Israeli Chambers of Commerce, and is funded by the Government and Manufacturers Association, as well as independent revenues.

In December 2022, newly appointed Economy Minister Nir Barkat issued an invitation to tender for a private entity to fulfill the IE's role alongside it.

== See also ==
- Economy of Israel
